= Adventure, Utah =

Ghost Town in Utah, United States

Coordinates: 37.161924°N 113.072997°W

Adventure was an early settlement in Washington County, Utah, United States, established in 1860 by Philip Klingensmith and five other people from Iron County. They formed a small settlement as part of the cotton growing colony in the area, at a place a couple of miles up the Virgin River from Grafton. Adventure was destroyed by the Great Flood of 1862 and the settlers moved to settle on some nearby land with more space for growth and above the river floods, in what is now the center of Rockville.

The site of Adventure is just west of Rockville center, on the south side of the Virgin River, east of Grafton. The legal boundaries of Rockville now include Adventure and Grafton.

== See also ==
- List of ghost towns in Utah
