= Great Flood of 1862 =

Flood in California, Oregon, and Nevada

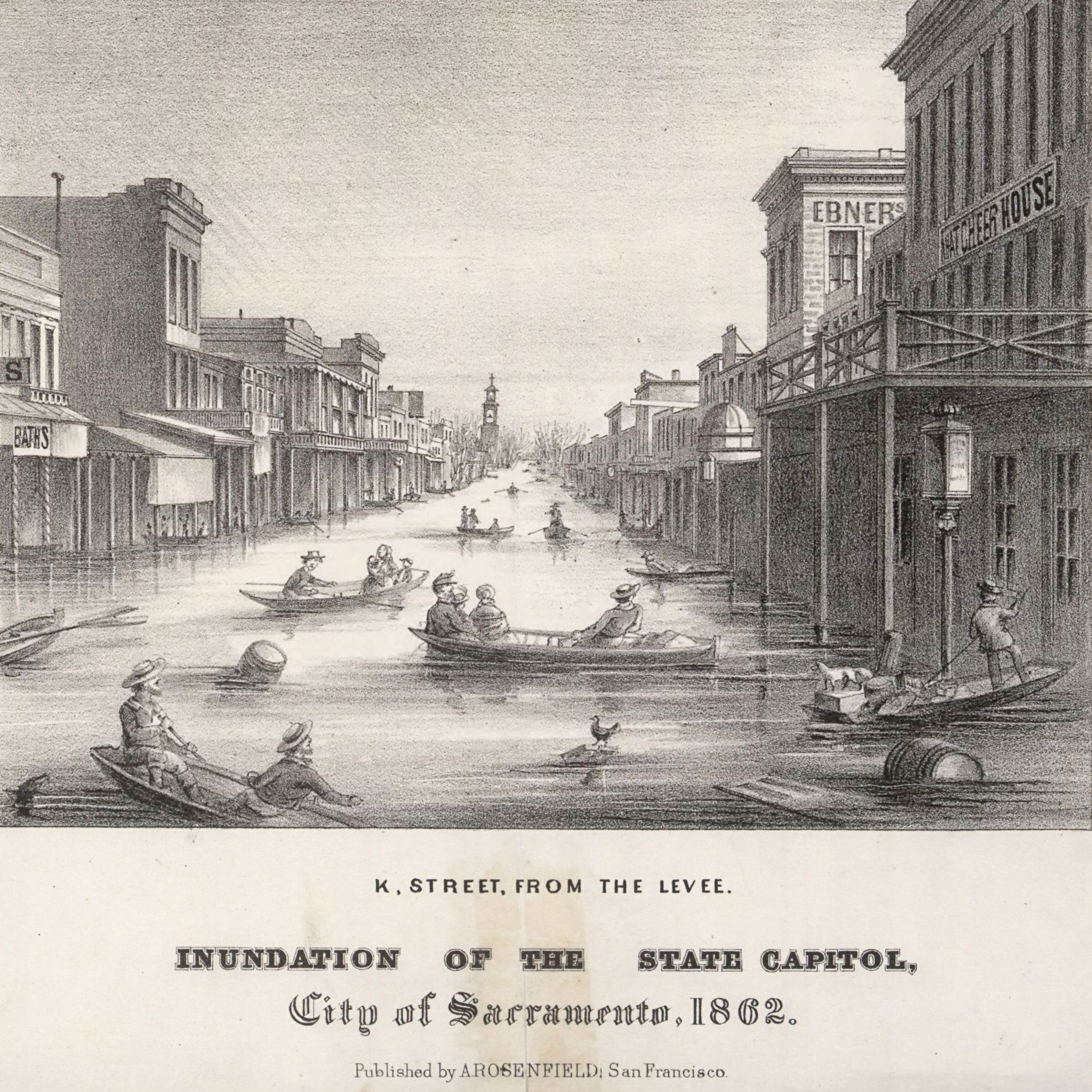
- Lithograph of K Street in the city of Sacramento, California, during the Great Flood of 1862
- Date: December 1861 – January 1862
- Location: Washington, Oregon, Nevada, California, Idaho, Arizona, New Mexico, Utah, Baja California, Sonora, Mexico
- Deaths: >4,000
- Property damage: $100 million (1861 USD) $3.117 billion (2021 USD)

The Great Flood of 1862 was the largest flood in the recorded history of California, Oregon, and Nevada, inundating the Western United States and portions of British Columbia and Mexico. It was preceded by weeks of continuous rains and snows that began in Oregon in November 1861 and continued into January 1862. This was followed by a record amount of rain from January 9–12, and contributed to a flood that extended from the Columbia River southward in western Oregon, and through California to San Diego, as well as extending as far inland as the Washington Territory (now Idaho), the Utah Territory (now Nevada and Utah), and the western New Mexico Territory (now Arizona).

The event dumped an equivalent of 10 feet (3.0 m) of precipitation in California, in the form of rain and snow, over a period of 43 days. Immense snowfalls in the mountains of far western North America caused more flooding in Idaho, Arizona, New Mexico, as well as in Baja California and Sonora, Mexico the following spring and summer, as the snow melted.

The event was capped by an intense, warm storm that melted the heavy snow load that had accumulated during the earlier storms. The resulting snow-melt flooded valleys, inundated or swept away towns, mills, dams, flumes, houses, fences, and domestic animals, and ruined fields. It has been described as the worst disaster ever to strike California. The storms caused an estimated $100 million (1861 US dollars) in damage, roughly equivalent to $3.6 billion in 2025. The governor, state legislature, and state employees were not paid for a year and a half. At least 4,000 people were estimated to have been killed in the floods in California, which was roughly 1% of the state population at the time.

== Background ==
The weather pattern that caused this flood was not from an El Niño–type event. From the existing Army and private weather records, it has been determined that the polar jet stream was to the north because the Pacific Northwest experienced a mild rainy pattern for the first half of December 1861. In 2012, hydrologists and meteorologists concluded that the precipitation was likely caused by a series of atmospheric rivers that hit the Western United States along the entire West Coast, from Oregon to Southern California.

An atmospheric river is a wind-borne, deep layer of water vapor with origins in the tropics, extending from the surface to high altitudes, often above 10,000 feet, and concentrated into a relatively narrow band, typically about 400 to 600 kilometres (250 to 370 mi) wide, usually running ahead of a frontal boundary, or merging into it. With the right dynamics in place to provide lift, an atmospheric river can produce astonishing amounts of precipitation, especially if it stalls over an area for any length of time.

The floods followed a 20-year-long drought. During November, prior to the flooding, Oregon had steady but heavier-than-normal rainfall, with heavier snow in the mountains. Researchers believe the jet stream had slipped south, accompanied by freezing conditions reported at Oregon stations by December 25. Heavy rainfall began falling in California as the longwave trough moved south over the state, remaining there until the end of January 1862, causing precipitation to fall everywhere in the state for nearly 40 days. Eventually, the trough moved even further south, causing snow to fall in the Central Valley and surrounding mountain ranges (15 feet (4.6 m) of snow in the Sierra Nevada mountains).

== Impact by region ==
=== Oregon ===
There was an excessive amount of precipitation in November 1861 over most of Oregon, less so in the extreme northwest. It was cold enough at the higher elevations that much snow fell in the Cascade Range, which, when later melted by the warm rains, produced a great quantity of water that flooded into the Willamette River and other streams in the Cascades. Tributaries of the Willamette originating in the Oregon Coast Range did not rise as high. A tropical depression that came in at the beginning of December produced strong, warm southerly winds in Oregon, with extremely heavy rain. Flooding was heaviest on rivers with tributaries arising from the snow-covered Cascade Range. The crest of the Willamette flood was reached at Salem on December 3; at Oregon City on the 4th; at Milwaukie, between Oregon City and Portland, on the 5th; at Albany on December 8. The crests at Albany and Salem were the highest ever known at any time. In Oregon, the flood was one of the largest in the recorded history of the Willamette Valley and the rest of Western Oregon.

An article in the December 14, 1861, Oregon City Argus, described the course of the flood at Oregon City:

During the month of November the rain had been falling almost continuously, and a vast amount of snow must have accumulated in the mountains...

Tuesday evening a gloom settled on a scene such as probably never was witnessed in our Valley before. The ceaseless roar of the stream made a fearful elemental music widely different from the ordinary monotone of the Falls; while the darkness was only made more visible by the glare of torches and hurrying lights, which with the shouts of people from the windows of houses surrounded by the water, all conspired to render the hour one of intense and painful excitement. The flood has covered the highest mark of January '53, and is still rapidly rising. As late as anything could be seen the mills were still standing, but the insatiate monster is still creeping up inch by inch, winding its swelling folds round the pillars and foundations of all the houses in its way, crushing and grinding them in the maw of destruction, and sweeping the broken fragments into a common vortex of ruin. All night as on the night previous, people whose homes were being invaded hurried to places of security, glad to escape even with the sacrifice of all their goods.

The light of Wednesday morning revealed a scene of desolation terrible in its extent no less than in its completeness. The Oregon City and Island Mills, Willamette Iron Works, Foundry and Machine Shop were all gone...

Flood waters were so high that at Oregon City at the flood's crest on December 5, the steamer St. Clair was able to run the falls, and steamers were able to visit points at some distance from the normal river channel. Although large amounts of wheat and flour were swept away, some was recovered when Oregon City's Island Mill was found on Sauvie Island downriver from Portland. The nearby town of Linn City was completely destroyed by flooding and was not rebuilt. The flood destroyed the historic towns of Champoeg, site of the first provisional government in Oregon, and Orleans, across the Willamette River from Corvallis. Neither was rebuilt.

The flooding was also severe in other parts of Oregon; to the south, the Umpqua River had the greatest flood known even to the oldest Native Americans, and water was 10 to 15 feet (3.0 to 4.6 m) higher than the 1853 flood. It rose from November 3 to December 3, subsided for two days, then rose again until the 9th. At Fort Umpqua, communication upriver was cut off above Scottsburg, and the river was full of floating houses, barns, rails and produce. The Coquille River swept away settlers' property, and there was also great damage on the Rogue River and on other small streams."

Economic losses from flood damage were severe, as the rivers in Oregon were the main routes of travel. The riverfront was the building site of mills, freight depots, and storehouses for grain and other foodstuffs. Business houses and many residences were near the landings. Farm buildings were mostly on sites convenient to the rivers and supplies of feed for livestock. Loss of so much wheat flour and the new demand coming since 1860 from the recently opened Idaho gold fields caused a spike in its price from $7 to $12 per barrel.

=== Idaho ===
In the interior of Washington Territory, in what is now Idaho, the storm creating the flood in Oregon dumped its precipitation as an unprecedented snowfall. Flooding on the Columbia River and the snow in the mountains closed off supplies to the new mining towns on the Salmon River, causing starvation among the miners of Florence, who were cut off from December until May 1862. By early July, as the heavy burden of snow in the mountains finally melted, the runoff caused great flooding. The Boise River flooded from extremely high runoff and is believed to have been four times larger than its largest recorded flood in 1943. Flood waters made the river expand to a couple of miles wide. It washed away or covered the original route of the Oregon Trail in the river valley.

=== California ===
California was hit by a combination of incessant rain, snow, and then unseasonably high temperatures. In Northern California, it snowed heavily during the later part of November and the first few days of December, until the temperature rose unusually high and it began to rain. In San Francisco, there were 35 inches of precipitation in December 1861–January 1862, and almost 50 for the season. There were four distinct rainy periods: The first occurred on December 9, 1861, the second on December 23–28, the third on January 9–12, and the fourth on January 15–17.

Native Americans knew that the Sacramento Valley could become an inland sea when the rains came. Their storytellers described water filling the valley from the Coast Range to the Sierra Nevada.

==== Northern California ====
Fort Ter-Waw, located in Klamath Glen, California, was destroyed by the flood in December 1861 and abandoned on June 10, 1862. Bridges were washed away in Trinity and Shasta counties. At Red Dog in Nevada County, William Begole reported that from December 23 to January 22 it rained a total of 25.5 inches (650 mm), and on January 10 and 11 alone, it rained over 11 inches (280 mm).

At Weaverville, John Carr was a witness to the sudden melt of snow by the heavy rain and onset of the flood in December 1861 on the Trinity River:

From November until the latter part of March there was a succession of storms and floods... The ground was covered with snow 1 foot [30 cm] deep, and on the mountains much deeper... The water in the river ... seemed like some mighty uncontrollable monster of destruction broken away from its bonds, rushing uncontrollably on, and everywhere carrying ruin and destruction in its course. When rising, the river seemed highest in the middle... From the head settlement to the mouth of the Trinity River, for a distance of one hundred and fifty miles, everything was swept to destruction. Not a bridge was left, or a mining-wheel or a sluce-box. Parts of ranches and miners cabins met the same fate. The labor of hundreds of men, and their savings of years, invested in bridges, mines and ranches, were all swept away. In forty-eight hours the valley of the Trinity was left desolate. The county never recovered from that disastrous flood. Many of the mining-wheels and bridges were never rebuilt.

Two years later William H. Brewer saw, near Crescent City, the debris of the flood:

The floods of two years ago brought down an immense amount of driftwood from all the rivers along the coast, and it was cast up along this part of the coast in quantities that stagger belief. It looked to me as if I saw enough in ten miles along the shore to make a million cords of wood.... One I measured was 210 feet [64 m] long and 3 1/2 feet [1.1 m] at the little end, without the bark.

==== Central Valley ====
The entire Sacramento and San Joaquin valleys were affected. An area about 300 miles (480 km) long, averaging 20 miles (32 km) in width, and covering 5,000 to 6,000 square miles (13,000 to 16,000 km^{2}) was under water. The water flooding the Central Valley reached depths up to 30 feet (9.1 m), completely submerging telegraph poles that had just been installed between San Francisco and New York. Transportation, mail, and communications across the state were disrupted for a month. Water covered portions of the valley from December 1861, through the spring, and into the summer of 1862.

The rainy season commenced on the 8th of November, and for four weeks, with scarcely any intermission, the rain continued to fall very gently in San Francisco, but in heavy showers in the interior. According to the statement of a Grass Valley paper, nine inches of rain fell there in thirty-six hours on the 7th and 8th inst.... the next day the river-beds were full almost to the hilltops. The North Fork of the American River at Auburn rose thirty-five feet, and in many other mountain streams the rise was almost as great. On the 9th the flood reached the low land of the Sacramento Valley.

In Knights Ferry, in the foothills of the Sierra Nevada astride the Stanislaus River, about 40 miles (64 km) east of Modesto, the town's homes, its mill, and most of its businesses were ruined by the flood. The bridge spanning the river initially withstood the flood waters but was destroyed when the debris of the bridge at Two-Mile Bar, only a short distance up river, was torn from its foundation and crashed into the Knights Ferry Bridge, crushing the truss supports and knocking it from its rock foundation. All Sacramento excepting one street, part of Marysville, part of Santa Rosa, part of Auburn, part of Sonora, part of Nevada City, and part of Napa were under water. Some smaller towns like Empire City and Mokelumne City were entirely destroyed.

==== Sacramento ====
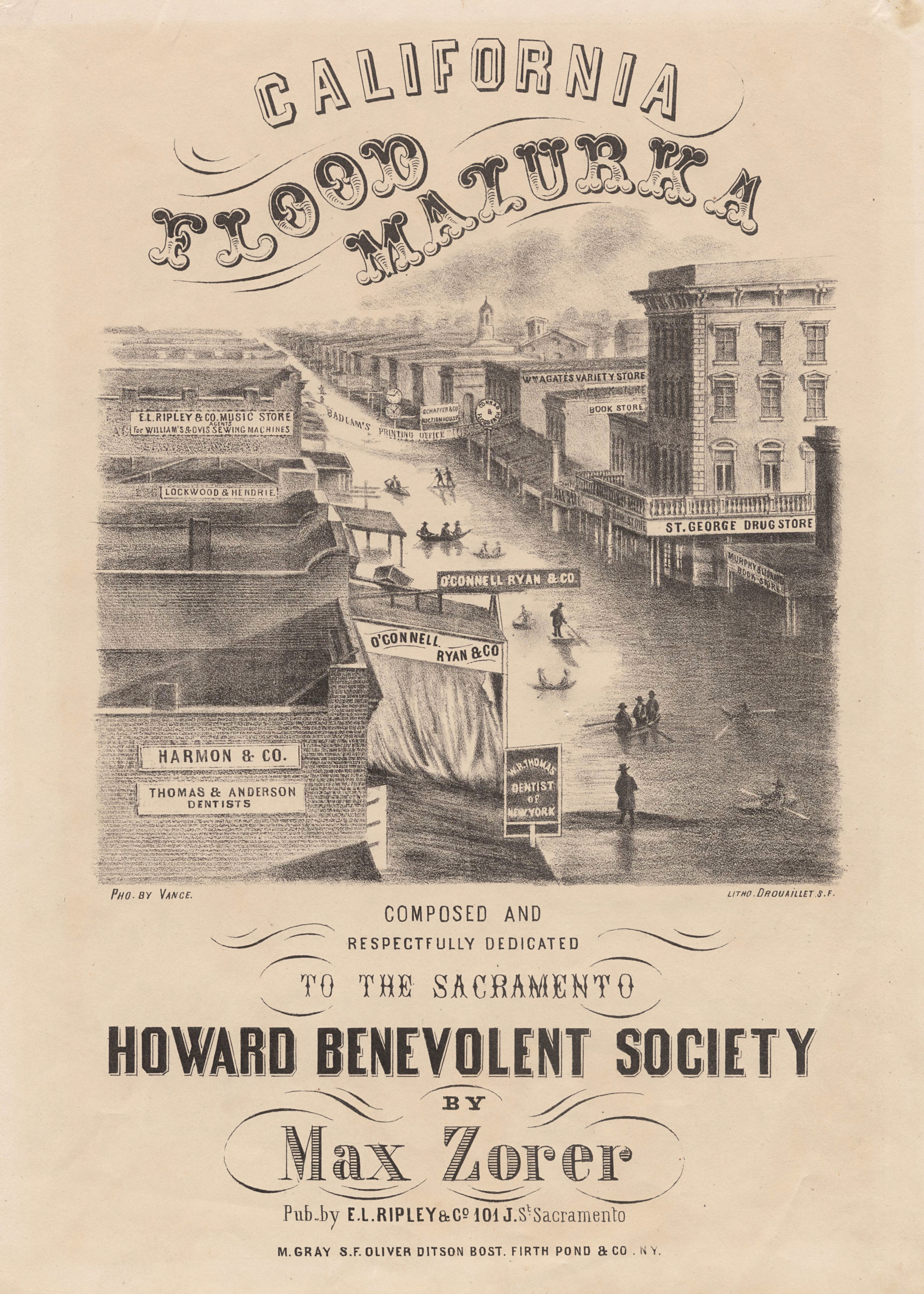
Sheet music cover depicting Sacramento flooding

Sacramento, sited at the junction of the Sacramento and American Rivers, was originally built at 16 feet (4.9 m) above low-water mark, and the river usually rose 17 to 18 feet (5.2 to 5.5 m) almost every year. The New York Times reported on January 21, 1862, that a trapper who had spent more than 20 years in California had frequently boated over the city's site, and in 1846, the water at the location was 7 feet (2.1 m) deep for sixty days. On 27 December 1861, the Sacramento River reached a flood level of 22 feet 7 inches (6.88 m) above the low water mark, after rising 10 feet (3.0 m) during the prior 24 hours.

By 1861, the Sacramento flood plain had quickly become inhabited by a growing population during the Gold Rush, and had begun to serve as the central hub for Valley commerce and trade and as the home of the California State Legislature. The landscape was recognized as a flood-prone landscape located at the confluence of the American and Sacramento River. John Muir noted the extent of seasonal flooding in Sacramento, "…The greatest floods occur in winter, when one could suppose all the wild waters would be muffled and chained in frost and snow…rare intervals warm rains and warm winds invade the mountains and push back the snow line from 2000 to 8,000 feet, or even higher, and then come the big floods."

However, the series of storms that led to the Great Flood of 1862 averaged precipitation levels that records show only occur once every 500 to 1,000 years. The geographical range of flooding in the state was noted by a traveling geologist from Yale University, William Brewer, who wrote that on January 19, 1862,

The great Central Valley of the state is under water—the Sacramento and San Joaquin valleys—a region 250 to 300 miles long and an average of at least 20 miles wide, a district of 5,000 or 6,000 square miles, or probably three to three and a half million acres! Although much of it is not cultivated, yet a part of it is the garden of the state. Thousands of farms are entirely under water—cattle starving and drowning.

From December to January 1862 the series of storms carrying high winds and heavy precipitation left city streets and sidewalks underwater. Photographs show canals in place of city streets and boats docked to storefronts.

On Inauguration Day, January 10, 1862, the state's eighth governor, Leland Stanford, traveled by rowboat to his inauguration building held at the State Legislature office. Much of Sacramento remained under water for 3 months after the storms passed. As a result of the flooding, from January 23, 1862, the state capital was moved temporarily from Sacramento to San Francisco.

===== Levee damage =====
The city of Sacramento suffered the worst damage due to its levee, which lay in a wide and flat valley at the junction of the American and Sacramento rivers. When the floodwaters entered from the higher ground on the east, the levee acted as a dam to keep the water in the city rather than let it flow out. Soon the water level was 10 feet (3.0 m) higher inside than the level of the Sacramento River on the outside.

John Carr wrote of his riverboat trip up the Sacramento River when it was at one of its highest stages of flood:

... I was a passenger on the old steamer Gem, from Sacramento to Red Bluff. The only way the pilot could tell where the channel of the river was, was by the cottonwood trees on each side of the river. The boat had to stop several times and take men out of the tops of trees and off the roofs of houses. In our trip up the river we met property of every description floating down—dead horses and cattle, sheep, hogs, houses, haystacks, household furniture, and everything imaginable was on its way for the ocean. Arriving at Red Bluff, there was water everywhere as far as the eye could reach, and what few bridges there had been in the country were all swept away.

Dozens of wood houses, some two stories high, were simply lifted up and carried off by the flood, as was "all the firewood, most of the fences and sheds, all the poultry, cats, rats and many of the cows and horses". The Chinese in their poorly built shantytowns were disproportionately affected.

A chain gang was sent to break open the levee, which, when it finally broke, allowed the waters to rush out of the city center and lowered the level of the flooding by 5–6 feet (1.5–1.8 m). Eventually the waters fell to a level on a par with the lowest part of the city.

===== City rebuilding =====
Politicians addressed the flood risk with an investment of more than $1.5 million in flood control and prevention through an improved levee system around Sacramento and the greater Sacramento area.

Sacramento put efforts into restructuring the city's foundation by re-channeling the American River, reinforcing the established levee system, and passing a two-decade project to raise the city above flood level. Due to the high costs associated with flood recovery, the city of Sacramento reached out to the aid of the Transcontinental Railroad Co., which was a major turning point in levee resilience and reconstruction. Prior to the great flood, levee breaks and failures caused much destruction from flooding. The Transcontinental Railroad had laid tracks across the Sierra Nevada and stationed its major repair and production line in Sacramento. The Chinese workforce of over 14,000 reconstructed levees under the guidance of Charles Crocker, the head contractor for Central Pacific Railroad.

In response to a weak levee system and seasonal flooding, flood plain architecture was incorporated in residential infrastructure, evident in Victorian buildings throughout Midtown to Downtown Sacramento. Flood design includes raised front porches with stairs leading down to the street. In addition, small hollow spaces are built into the basement level to allow for basement flooding and aeration.

Old Town Sacramento was raised 15 feet above flood level. Ruins of the old city remain underneath the streets as tunnels leading nowhere, with hollow sidewalks, filled in entrances, trap doors, and rubble where storefronts and walkways used to be. Large wooden beams and soil brought in from surrounding areas helped to stabilize and build a foundation on top of the once-flooded city.

==== Southern California ====
In Southern California, beginning on December 24, 1861, it rained for 28 days in Los Angeles. In the San Gabriel Mountains the mining town of Eldoradoville was washed away by flood waters. The flooding drowned thousands of cattle and washed away fruit trees and vineyards that grew along the Los Angeles River. No mail was received at Los Angeles for five weeks. The Los Angeles Star reported that:

The road from Tejon, we hear, has been almost washed away. The San Fernando mountain cannot be crossed except by the old trail ... over the top of the mountain. The plain has been cut up into gulches and arroyos, and streams are rushing down every declivity.

The plains of Los Angeles County, at the time a marshy area with many small lakes and several meandering streams from the mountains, were extensively flooded, and much of the agricultural development that lay along the rivers was ruined. In most of the lower areas, small settlements were submerged. These flooded areas formed into a large lake system with many small streams. A few more powerful currents cut channels across the plain and carried the runoff to the sea.

In Los Angeles County, (including what is now Orange County) the flooding Santa Ana River created an inland sea lasting about three weeks with water standing 4 feet (1.2 m) deep up to 4 miles (6 km) from the river. In February 1862, the Los Angeles, San Gabriel, and Santa Ana Rivers merged. Government surveys at the time indicated that a solid expanse of water covered the area from Signal Hill to Huntington Beach, a distance of approximately 18 miles (29 km).

At Santa Barbara County, the narrow coastal plains were flooded by the rivers coming out of the mountains. The San Buenaventura Mission Aqueduct that was still drawing water from a tributary of the Ventura River for the town of Ventura water system, was abandoned due to the damage in the area that became the separate Ventura County in 1873.

In San Bernardino County, all the fertile riverside fields and all but the church and one house of the New Mexican colony of Agua Mansa were swept away by the Santa Ana River, which overflowed its banks. A priest rang the church bell on the night of January 22, 1862, alerting the inhabitants to the approach of the flood, and all escaped.

In San Diego, a storm at sea backed up the flood water running into the bay from the San Diego River, resulting in a new river channel cut into San Diego Harbor. The continuous heavy downpour also changed the look of the land, the previously rounded hills were extensively cut by gulleys and canyons.

To the north, in the Owens Valley, similar snow and flooding conditions as those to the east in Aurora, Nevada (see below) led to the local Paiute suffering the loss of much of the game they depended on. Cattle, newly driven into the valley to feed the miners, competed with the native grazers and ate the native wild plant crops the Paiute depended on to survive. Starving, the Paiute began to kill the cattle and conflict with the cattlemen began, leading to the subsequent Owens Valley Indian War.

==== Economic impact ====
In March 1862, the Wool Growers Association reported that 100,000 sheep and 500,000 lambs were killed by the floods. Even oyster beds in San Francisco Bay near Oakland were reported to be dying from the effects of the immense amounts of freshwater entering the bay. Full of sediment, the silted water smothered the oyster beds. One-quarter of California's estimated 800,000 cattle were killed by the flood, accelerating the end of the cattle-based ranchero society. One-fourth to one-third of the state's property was destroyed, and one home in eight was carried away or ruined by the flood-waters. Mining equipment such as sluices, flumes, wheels and derricks were carried away across the state.

An early estimate of property damage was $10 million. However, later it was estimated that approximately one-quarter of the taxable real estate in the state of California was destroyed in the flood. The state almost had to declare bankruptcy due to the costs of the damage and the loss of tax revenue.

=== Nevada ===
The Carson River Basin of the eastern California and western Utah Territory (now Nevada), suffered from a similar pattern of flooding. Flooding began in December 1861 in Carson Valley from a series of storms in the upper Carson River basin. Two feet (61 cm) of wet heavy snow fell on December 20, 1861, accumulating on the valley floor. Snow was followed by a period of very cold temperatures which froze the snow, followed by a three-day rain starting on December 25, 1861. By January 2, 1862, the town of Dayton and the area surrounding it had been flooded.

In the vicinity of Aurora, there had been light snowfall in November, then mild weather until Christmas Eve, when there began a heavy and rapid snowfall for days. The temperature dropped below zero and the passes over the Sierra were closed. During the second week of January, it warmed slightly, and the snow became a torrential rain. Esmerelda and Willow gulches overflowed their banks and flooded Aurora. With water standing up to 3 inches (76 mm) deep in many buildings, adobe buildings turned to mud and collapsed. After a week, it cooled again, and snow began to fall again. Within a few days, the snow was deeper than it had been before the rains had begun to fall. Samuel Young of Aurora recorded in his diary that the snow and rain had fallen for 26 days out of 30 since December 24, 1861.

=== Utah ===
The early southwestern Utah settlements in Washington County: Fort Clara, St. George, Grafton, Duncans Retreat, Adventure, and Northrop were nearly destroyed by a flood on the Virgin and Santa Clara Rivers, that followed 44 days of rainfall in January and February 1862. Survivors of Fort Clara established the modern town of Santa Clara a mile east of the old fort on the Santa Clara River. Springdale and Rockville were founded in 1862 by settlers flooded out of Adventure, Northup and other places in the vicinity. Settlers were driven from Fort Harmony in Iron County when the fort had to be abandoned after most of its adobe walls were washed away. The settlements of New Harmony and Kanarraville were then created by refugees from this disaster.

=== Arizona ===
In western New Mexico Territory, heavy rains fell in late January, causing severe flooding of the Colorado River and Gila River. On January 20, 1862, the Colorado River began to rise, and on the afternoon of January 22 it rose suddenly in three hours from an already high stage nearly 6 feet (1.8 m), overflowing its banks and turned Fort Yuma in California into an island in the midst of the Colorado River. At 1 o'clock on the morning of January 23, the river reached its crest. Jaeger City a mile down river from Fort Yuma, and Colorado City, across the Colorado River from it were washed away. The river overflowed its banks to the extent that there was water 20 feet (6.1 m) deep on a ranch in the low-lying ground just above Arizona City where the Gila River joined the Colorado. The riverside home of steamboat entrepreneur George Alonzo Johnson and the nearby Hooper residence were the only places in the town unharmed because they were built on high ground. Colorado City had to be rebuilt on higher ground after the 1862 flood.

The Gila River also flooded, covering its whole valley at its mouth where it met the Colorado from the sand hills on the south to the foothills on the north. Twenty miles (32 km) to the east of Fort Yuma, it swept away most of the mining boomtown of Gila City along with a supply of hay being gathered there to supply the planned advance of the California Column into Confederate Arizona. Further east the road was flooded, buildings and vehicles swept away and traffic was disrupted for some time thereafter by the mud covering the road to Tucson. The great flood in the Gila and Colorado rivers, covered their bottom lands with mud. Much of the livestock along the rivers drowned and the crops of the Indians along the river were destroyed.

The overflow of the 1862 Colorado River spring flood waters reached the Salton Sink via the Alamo and New Rivers, filling it and creating a lake some 60 miles (97 km) long and 30 miles (48 km) wide.

=== New Mexico ===
The spring and summer thaw of the immense snowpack during the winter of 1861–1862 in the southern Rocky Mountains and other ranges flooded the Rio Grande, and changed the river's course in the Mesilla Valley. Mesilla, built on the west bank of the Rio Grande, was left by the movement of the river on its east bank where it remains today.

The flood impeded the Union Army's California Column as it pursued the retreating Confederate Army of New Mexico. On July 8, 1862, Lt. Col. Edward E. Eyre, First California Volunteer Cavalry wrote:

The Rio Grande has been unusually high this summer, almost the entire bottom between Fort Craig and Mesilla being still overflowed. It is impossible at this time to approach Mesilla on the west side of the river, a new channel having been washed out on that side of the town, through which the largest portion of the water flows; besides, the bottom for a long distance is overflowed, and, the soil being of a loose nature, animals mire down in attempting to get through it.

Instead of crossing at Mesilla, the high waters and shift of the river forced Eyre's detachment to cross the Rio Grande upriver at San Diego Crossing below Fort Thorn, after a week awaiting the water to go down, which enabled the Confederates' escape into Texas.

=== Sonora, Mexico ===
Until the Great Flood of 1862, what became Port Isabel Slough, in Sonora, Mexico, was a shallow tidewater slough, but the extreme flood waters of that year cut its channel much deeper, so that at low tide it still was three fathoms deep. The mouth of this slough was only 5 miles (8.0 km) from the mouth of the river and sheltered from the extremes of the tidal bore of the Colorado River and deep enough to prevent stranding on shoals or mud flats at low tide. This made it an ideal anchorage for maritime craft to load and unload their cargo and passengers from the steamboats that took them up and down river without the danger from the tides that they were having to risk in the estuary at Robinson's Landing.

In the month of March 1865, the schooner Isabel, from San Francisco, commanded by W. H. Pierson, found and entered this slough and discharged her cargo there for the first time. Subsequently, the steamers, sailing ships and later ocean-going steamships loaded and off-loaded their cargoes there, and the steamboat company established Port Isabel 2.5 miles (4.0 km) above the mouth of the slough. The port lasted until 1878. After the Southern Pacific Railroad reached Yuma, it was abandoned the following year, the shipyard there being removed to Yuma.

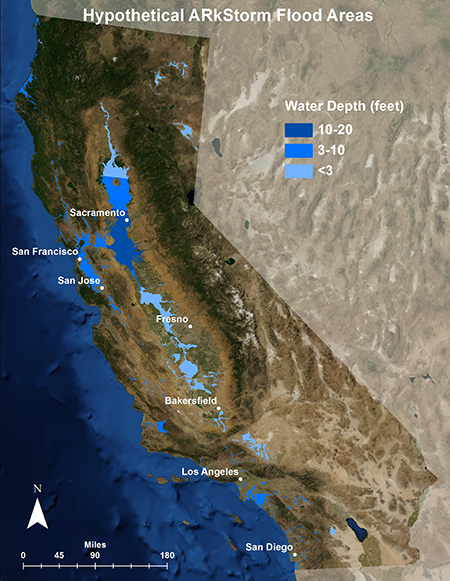
A map of the flood area of the hypothetical ARkStorm event

== Current interest ==
The storm was not an unprecedented occurrence. Geologic evidence has been found that massive floods, of equal or greater magnitude to the 1861–1862 event, have occurred in California roughly every 100 to 200 years. The United States Geological Survey has developed a hypothetical scenario, known as the "ARkStorm" (named for an atmospheric river event that has the likelihood of occurring once per 1,000 years), that would occur should a similar event occur in modern-day California. If such a storm were to occur today, it would probably cause $725 billion to $1 trillion in damage. The likelihood of a massive flooding event is estimated to have been increased due to climate change.

== See also ==
- 1996 Pacific Northwest floods
  - Willamette Valley flood of 1996
- 1997 California New Years Floods
- Los Angeles Flood of 1938
- California flood of 1605 – The largest known flood to strike California, significantly larger than the 1861–1862 event
- Floods in the United States before 1901
- 2021 Pacific Northwest floods
- List of floods
- List of deadliest floods
- List of natural disasters in the United States
