= Kanarraville, Utah =

- Town
- Location in Iron County and the state of Utah
- Coordinates: 37°32′16″N 113°10′52″W
- Country: United States
- State: Utah
- County: Iron
- Settled: 1861
- Incorporated: 1933
- Named for: Paiute Chief Canarrah (or Quanarrah)

Area
  - Total: 0.44 sq mi (1.15 km^{2})
  - Land: 0.44 sq mi (1.15 km^{2})
  - Water: 0 sq mi (0.00 km^{2})
- Elevation: 5,565 ft (1,696 m)

Population (2020)
  - Total: 442
  - Density: 914.2/sq mi (352.99/km^{2})
- Time zone: UTC-7 (Mountain (MST))
  - Summer (DST): UTC-6 (MDT)
- ZIP code: 84742
- Area code: 435
- FIPS code: 49-40030
- GNIS feature ID: 2412814
- Website: kanarraville.gov

Kanarraville (/kəˈnærəvɪl/ kə-NARR-ə-vil) is a town in Iron County, Utah, United States. The population was 442 at the 2020 census.

== Demographics ==
Historical population
Census	Pop.	Note	%±
1890	282		—
1900	225		−20.2%
1910	249		10.7%
1920	326		30.9%
1930	279		−14.4%
1940	309		10.8%
1950	263		−14.9%
1960	236		−10.3%
1970	204		−13.6%
1980	255		25.0%
1990	228		−10.6%
2000	311		36.4%
2010	355		14.1%
2020	442		24.5%
U.S. Decennial Census

As of the census of 2000, there were 311 people, 125 households, and 96 families residing in the town. The population density was 692.0 people per square mile (266.8/km^{2}). There were 155 housing units at an average density of 344.9 per square mile (133.0/km^{2}). The racial makeup of the town was 95.50% White, 1.61% Native American, 0.96% from other races, and 1.93% from two or more races. Hispanic or Latino of any race were 4.50% of the population.

There were 125 households, out of which 24.0% had children under the age of 18 living with them, 68.0% were married couples living together, 8.0% had a female householder with no husband present, and 22.4% were non-families. 21.6% of all households were made up of individuals, and 16.0% had someone living alone who was 65 years of age or older. The average household size was 2.49 and the average family size was 2.86.

In the town, the population was spread out, with 22.2% under the age of 18, 8.7% from 18 to 24, 19.3% from 25 to 44, 28.3% from 45 to 64, and 21.5% who were 65 years of age or older. The median age was 44 years. For every 100 females, there were 80.6 males. For every 100 females age 18 and over, there were 82.1 males.

The median income for a household in the town was $34,375, and the median income for a family was $38,906. Males had a median income of $25,938 versus $13,750 for females. The per capita income for the town was $14,773. About 10.0% of families and 40% of the population were below the poverty line, including 20% under age 18 and 38% of those age 65 or over.

== Geography ==
According to the United States Census Bureau, the town has a total area of 0.46 square miles (1.2 km^{2}), all land.

Kanarraville is located adjacent to the southwest end of Cedar Valley; it is also at the base of the Hurricane Cliffs, on the town's east border.

=== Climate ===
This region experiences warm (but not hot) and dry summers, with no average monthly temperatures above 71.6 °F. According to the Köppen Climate Classification system, Kanarraville has a warm-summer Mediterranean climate, abbreviated "Csb" on climate maps.

== History ==
Kanarra, later renamed Kanarraville, on Kanarra Creek, was first settled in 1861 and 1862. It was named for Piute Chief Canarrah or Quanarrah, but settlers spelled it Kanarrah or Kanarra. Its settlers were families driven from Fort Harmony when the fort had to be abandoned after most of its adobe walls were washed away during a month of heavy rains in January and February, during the Great Flood of 1862. New Harmony in Washington County was the other settlement created by refugees from this disaster.

== See also ==
- List of cities and towns in Utah
