= Holt Canyon =

Valley in Washington County, Utah

Holt Canyon, originally called Meadow Canyon or Meadow Valley, is a valley in Washington County, Utah. Its mouth lies at an elevation of 5,387 feet (1,642 m) where it enters the Escalante Valley. Its head lies at an elevation of 5,600 feet at 37°32′32″N 113°36′46″W west of the site of the ghost town of Hamblin, Utah (1856 to 1905).

== History ==
Meadow Canyon was the northern part of the long well watered meadow with excellent grazing, called Mountain Meadow that was used by the merchants and drovers on the Old Spanish Trail and later by travelers on the wagon road that followed the older trail, called the Mormon Road. Later the canyon was renamed Holt Canyon after James Holt, who came in 1867 to visit his brother-in-law, a settler of Hamblin, Utah. He subsequently took up land and built a house in the Canyon five miles north in what became the settlement of Holt, Utah, now known as the Holt Historical Site at an elevation of 5,482 feet (1,671 meters) at 37°34′42″N 113°38′00″W. Nearby is the Holt Cemetery at an elevation of 5,453 feet (1,662 meters) at 37°35′06″N 113°38′08″W.
