= Hamblin, Utah =

Hamblin
- Ghost town
- Location within Utah Location within the United States
- Coordinates: 37°32′38″N 113°36′24″W
- Country: United States
- State: Utah
- County: Washington
- Founded: 1856
- Founder: Jacob Hamblin
- Named for: Jacob Hamblin
- Elevation: 5,832 ft (1,778 m)
- Time zone: UTC-7 (Mountain (MST))
  - Summer (DST): UTC-6 (MDT)
- ZIP code: 84725
- Area code: 435
- GNIS feature ID: 1451257

Hamblin, now a ghost town, was a Mormon pioneer town along the Mormon Road, from 1856 to 1905. It was located at an elevation of 5,832 feet in Mountain Meadow in western Washington County, Utah, United States.

== History ==
Jacob Hamblin started a ranch and built a house for his family in 1856 overlooking Mountain Meadow soon after the building of the 1855 Leach Cutoff of the Mormon Road, a wagon road that passed from Mountain Meadow to Pinto, through Leach Canyon to Cedar City was built nearby. This saved 15 miles from the older route from Cedar City through Iron Springs, Antelope Springs, Pinto Creek (at modern Newcastle, Utah), to the north end of Mountain Meadow, in Holt Canyon. Other settlers soon came to ranch or farm, forming a settlement with homes that were built along a street with the church and school at the far end. It was called Fort Hamblin, later shortened to Hamblin. Drinking water for the town came from Hamblin Spring, a clear spring near the village at 37°32′34″N 113°36′20″W. Farms were irrigated springs in the Meadow. These settlers sold food and supplies to drovers of herds using the meadow, and immigrants, and teamsters passing along the wagon road. At the time of the 1857 Mountain Meadows Massacre, the seventeen children who survived, were brought to the town and were cared for there before they were returned to their relatives in Arkansas. In 1869, Jacob Hamblin received a call from Brigham Young to establish an Indian mission at Fort Kanab and left with his family.

After the railroads came to Utah in 1869 the Mormon Road ceased to be a major thoroughfare and Hamblin became a backwater. Over the decades since 1847 when the wagon road was established, the 16 mile long, lush spring fed meadow Fremont described was overgrazed by the passing herds, pack and wagon teams, causing increasing floods and consequent erosion, that also lowered the water table and dried up the springs that watered the meadow. Eventually this caused the people of Hamblin to relocate, many going to Enterprise, and the site became mostly deserted by 1890.

== The Site Today ==
Hamblin Cemetery 37°32′11″N 113°36′28″W and a few foundations of homes are all that remains of this town, in the Hamblin Historical Site. The site is off Pinto Road, a dirt road heading east off of State Highway 18 around Mile Marker 34. There are signs leading to the Hamblin Cemetery on FR010 and FR732. The town site is about a mile northeast of the cemetery.
