= Duncan's Retreat, Utah =

Duncan's Retreat
- Ghost town
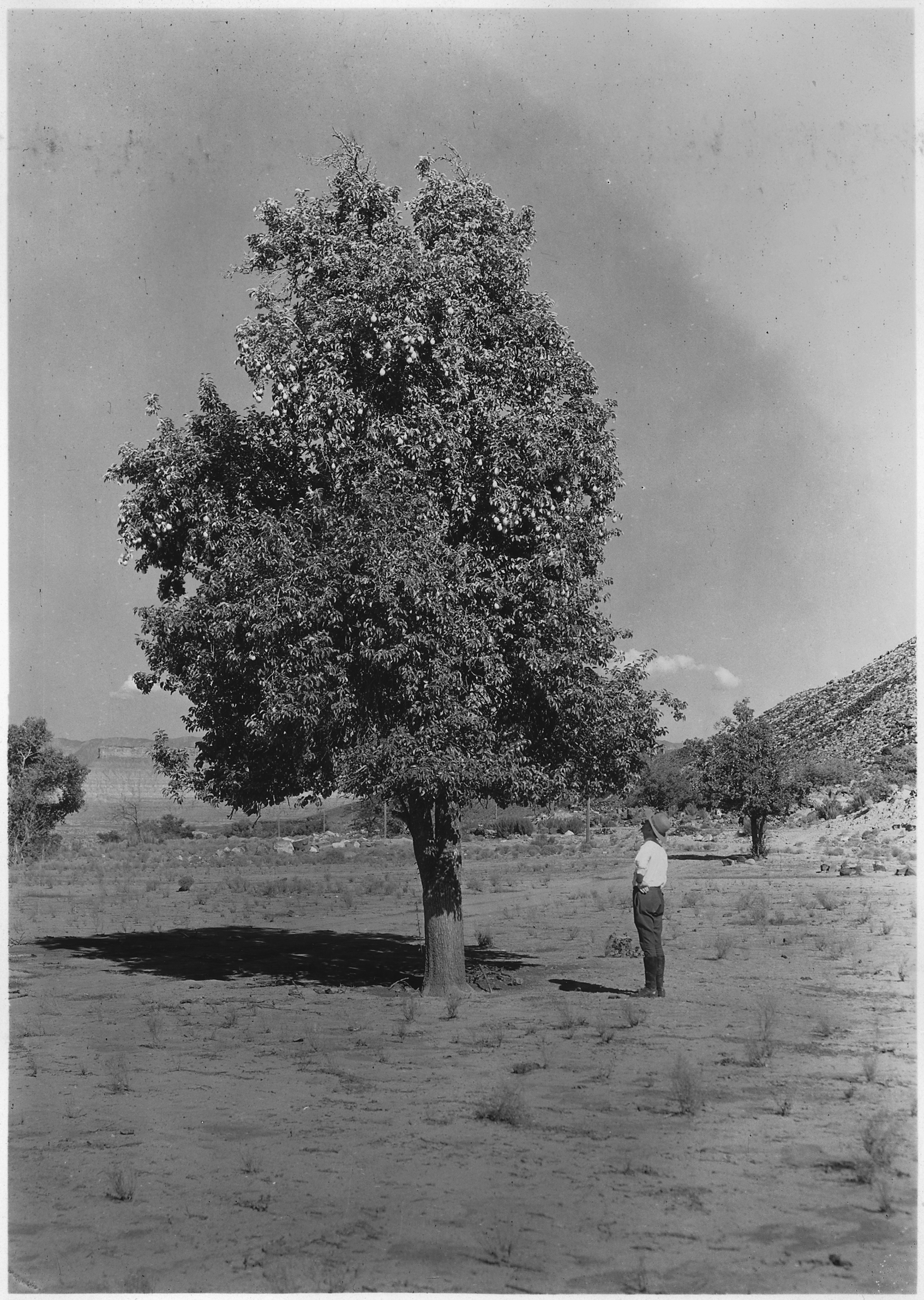
- One of many pear trees at the abandoned village, 30 August 1929

- Location within Utah Location within the United States
- Coordinates: 37°11′N 113°8′W
- Country: United States
- State: Utah
- County: Washington
- Established: 1861
- Abandoned: c.1895
- Named for: Chapman Duncan

Duncan's Retreat is a ghost town located just off Utah State Route 9 in the eastern part of Washington County, in southwestern Utah, United States. Lying some 3 miles (4.8 km) east of Virgin and just southwest of Zion National Park, Duncan's Retreat was inhabited about 1861–1895.

== History ==
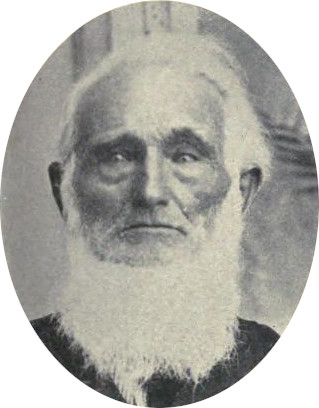
Chapman Duncan, one of the original settlers, whose name became attached to it after his departure

Chapman Duncan came here in 1861, settling with a few others on Mukuntuweap Creek, a small tributary of the Virgin River. The colony was part of a southern Utah cotton-growing project ordered by Brigham Young (see Utah's Dixie). That winter the Virgin River, unpredictable at even the best of times, experienced the Great Flood of 1862, which destroyed most of the settlement along with such other nearby towns as Grafton. Chapman Duncan and most of the other original settlers fled in early 1862 in search of a more stable home, and the families who stayed behind named their village Duncan's Retreat.

A local legend claims that Duncan's real reason for retreating was a botched surveying job. Duncan, so the story goes, was assigned to survey a canal to bring water from the Virgin River, but when it was dug, the canal was found to be useless as its route ran uphill. Another version of the story says it happened in Virgin, and that Duncan retreated to Duncan's Retreat.

Historical population
Census	Pop.	Note	%±
1870	71		—
1880	79		11.3%
1890	47		−40.5%
Source: U.S. Census Bureau

More settlers took the place of the departing pioneers, and by the end of 1862 Duncan's Retreat had a population of about 70. They planted crops and orchards, producing large harvests in the years the river did not flood. Cotton, corn, wheat, and sorghum grew particularly well. A post office was established here in 1863, and a schoolhouse in 1864. In 1866, when the Black Hawk War caused widespread fear of Indian attacks, the town was evacuated to Virgin, although farmers returned to Duncan's Retreat each day to work their fields. Residents moved back permanently in 1868.

Farming in Duncan's Retreat was a difficult life. The fertile land yielded bumper crops in good years, but could be washed away by torrential floods at any time. Of the 11 families living here in 1870, 9 remained in 1880. The next decade was much harsher; by 1891 Duncan's Retreat was all but deserted. The last known birth in town was in 1895.

All that remains of Duncan's Retreat is some dead fruit trees, an irrigation ditch, and a few graves on the north side of Utah State Route 9 between Virgin and Grafton.
