= Northrop, Utah =

Ghost town in Utah, United States

Coordinates: 37°09′45″N 113°00′45″W

Northrop, now a ghost town, was a small, early settlement in Washington County, Utah, United States, established in 1861 by Isaac Behunin. It was located at the confluence of the North Fork and East Fork of the Virgin River. It was one of the settlements formed as part of the cotton growing colony in the County.

Northrop was destroyed by the Great Flood of 1862 and the settlers moved to settle on some nearby land with more space for growth and above the river floods, in what is now Springdale.

== Site today ==
The site of Northrop was just at the confluence of the North and East Forks of the Virgin River, on the east side of the Virgin River east of Grafton. Nothing remains; the site was just beginning to be settled when it was washed away by the worst flood recorded in the Western United States.

== See also ==
- List of ghost towns in Utah
