= Brookside, Utah =

Unincorporated community in the state of Utah, United States

- Unincorporated community
- Location within Utah Location within the United States
- Coordinates: 37°21′37″N 113°39′39″W
- Country: United States
- State: Utah
- County: Washington County, Utah
- Elevation: 4,879 ft (1,487 m)

Population
  - Total: 483
- Time zone: UTC-6 (Central (CST))
  - Summer (DST): UTC-5 (CDT)
- ZIP code: 84782
- Area code: 435

Brookside, Utah is an unincorporated community located in Washington County. It is near the city of Veyo.

== History ==
Thomas Alfred Jeffery founded Brookside in 1902 as a travelers' rest stop.

In 1953, the Baker Reservoir was built in the city limits to increase economy and tourism in Brookside. The recreation area was developed in the 1980s.
