= Pinto, Utah =

Unincorporated community in the state of Utah, United States

Pinto
- Unincorporated community
- Location within Utah Location within the United States
- Coordinates: 37°32′18″N 113°31′00″W
- Country: United States
- State: Utah
- County: Washington
- Founded: 1856
- Founder: Rufus C. Allen
- Elevation: 6,060 ft (1,850 m)
- Time zone: UTC-7 (Mountain (MST))
  - Summer (DST): UTC-6 (MDT)
- ZIP code: 84756
- Area code: 435
- GNIS feature ID: 1444429

Pinto is an unincorporated community in Washington County, Utah, United States. It was established in 1856 by Rufus C. Allen and other leaders of the LDS Southern Indian Mission so they could move away from Fort Harmony, Utah and John D. Lee's attempts to usurp their authority.
