= Deep Creek North Wilderness =

Protected area in Utah, United States

- IUCN category Ib (wilderness area)
- Location within Utah Location within the United States
- Location: Washington County, Utah, USA
- Nearest city: Cedar City, UT
- Coordinates: 37.45264°N 112.93288°W
- Area: 4,262 acres (17.2 km^{2})
- Established: March 30, 2009
- Governing body: Bureau of Land Management

Deep Creek Wilderness is a 4,262-acre (17.2 km^{2}) wilderness area in the US state of Utah. It was designated March 30, 2009, as part of the Omnibus Public Land Management Act of 2009. Together with the Deep Creek Wilderness to the south it encompasses and protects much of Deep Creek, a tributary of the Wild & Scenic Virgin River, as well as 7,546-acre (30.5 km^{2}) of the surrounding land.

== See also ==
- List of U.S. Wilderness Areas
- Wilderness Act
