= Mountain Meadow, Utah =

Historic area in Washington County, Utah

Mountain Meadow or Mountain Meadows, is an area in present-day Washington County, Utah. It was a place of rest and grazing used by pack trains and drovers, on the Old Spanish Trail and later Mormons, Forty-niners, mail riders, migrants and teamsters on the Mormon Road on their way overland between Utah and California.

== History ==
In 1856, Mormon settlers established Hamblin east of the head of Holt Canyon, originally called Meadow Canyon. Mountain Meadow is the location of the September 11, 1857 Mountain Meadows Massacre, marked by the Mountain Meadows Massacre Memorial, at 37°28′32″N 113°38′37″W. The children that survived the massacre were first taken in by families in Hamblin.

Mountain Meadow was originally much larger, with better water and grazing than today, running 10 miles from Holt Canyon. at 37°35′35″N 113°38′08″W on the north, to the upper reach of Magotsu Creek to the south. It is located at 37°31′03″N 113°37′17″W, 37°29′34″N 113°37′57″W and 37°30′35″N 113°37′43″W. Its elevation lay at 5,869 feet / 1,789 meters. Overgrazing of the meadows subsequently led to their erosion, and consequent lowering of the water table, drying up many of its springs and degrading of the meadow grasslands. This in turn led to the abandonment of the settlement of Hamblin by 1905.

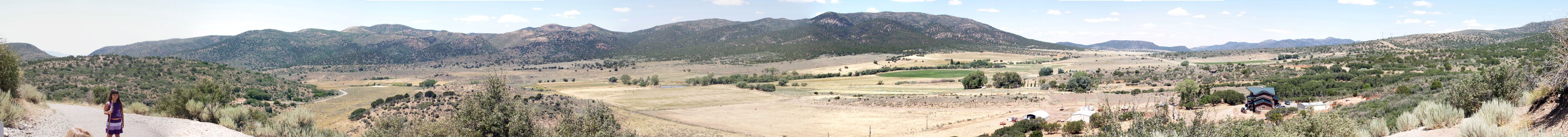
Large panorama of the area in 2009
