= Dammeron Valley, Utah =

Dammeron Valley
- CDP
- Location in Washington County and the state of Utah
- Coordinates: 37°18′13″N 113°39′46″W
- Country: United States
- State: Utah
- County: Washington
- Elevation: 4,626 ft (1,410 m)

Population (2020)
  - Total: 871
- Time zone: UTC-7 (Mountain (MST))
  - Summer (DST): UTC-6 (MDT)
- ZIP codes: 84783
- Area code: 435
- GNIS feature ID: 2629948

Dammeron Valley is a census-designated place in central Washington County, Utah, United States. The population was 871 at the 2020 census. Although Dammeron Valley is unincorporated, it has its own ZIP code of 84783.

== Demographics ==
Historical population
Census	Pop.	Note	%±
2010	803		—
2020	871		8.5%

As of the census of 2010, there were 803 people living in the CDP. There were 317 housing units. The racial makeup of the town was 98.6% White, 0.5% American Indian and Alaska Native, 0.7% Asian, 0.2% Native Hawaiian and Other Pacific Islander, 0.4% from some other race, and 1.5% from two or more races. Hispanic or Latino of any race were 1.5% of the population.

== See also ==
- List of census-designated places in Utah
