= Deep Creek Wilderness =

Protected area in Utah, United States

- IUCN category Ib (wilderness area)
- Location within Utah Location within the United States
- Location: Washington County, Utah, USA
- Nearest city: Cedar City, UT
- Coordinates: 37.3887°N 112.9357°W
- Area: 3,284 acres (13.3 km^{2})
- Established: March 30, 2009
- Governing body: Bureau of Land Management

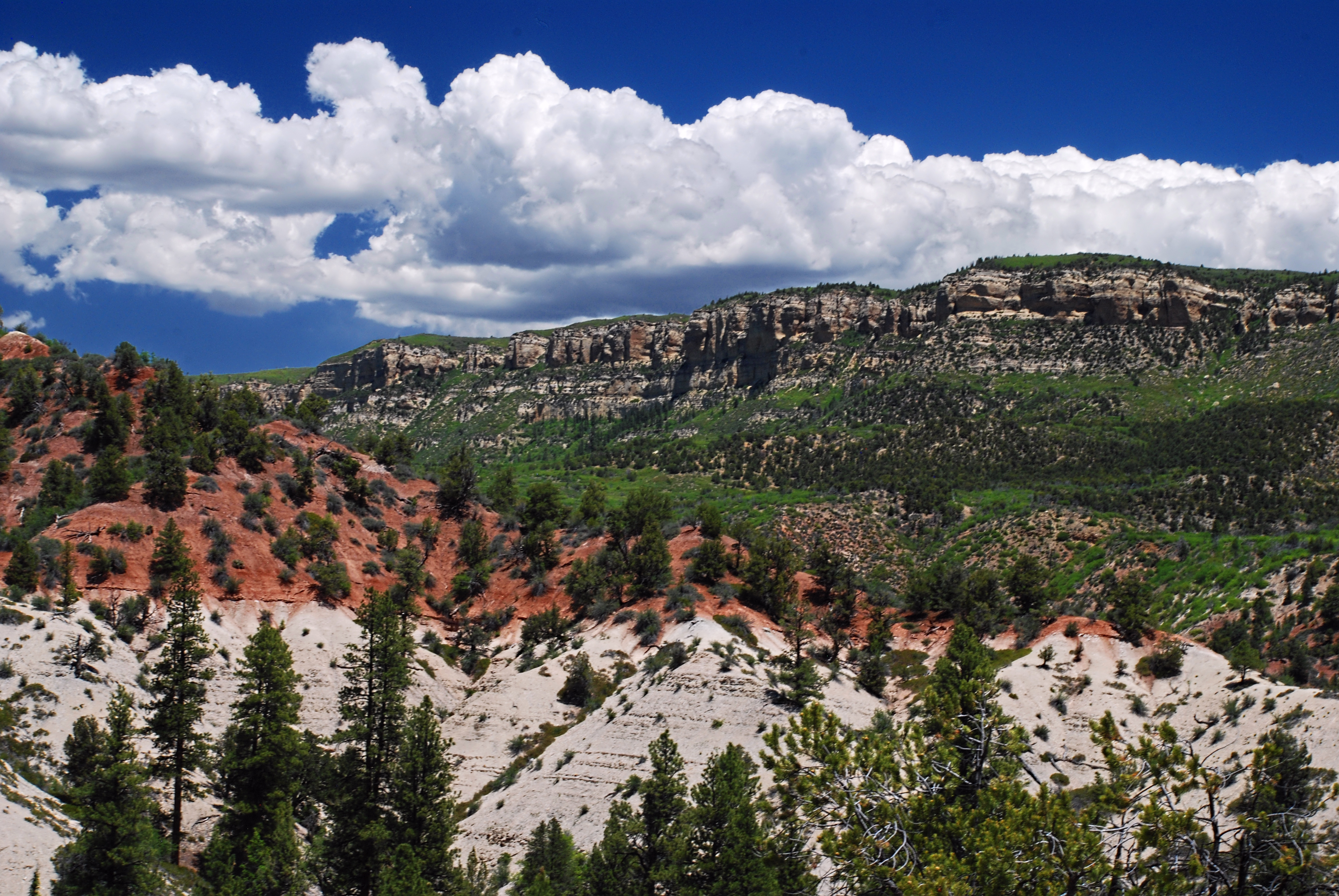
Deep Creek Wilderness, St George Field Office

Deep Creek Wilderness is a 3,284-acre (13.3 km^{2}) wilderness area in the US state of Utah. Together with the Deep Creek North Wilderness it protects 7,546-acre (30.5 km^{2}). It was designated March 30, 2009, as part of the Omnibus Public Land Management Act of 2009. Located adjacent to northeastern corner of Zion National Park, it encompasses and protects much of Deep Creek, a tributary of the Wild & Scenic Virgin River. Deep Creek Wilderness is bordered by the Zion Wilderness to the south.

== See also ==
- List of U.S. Wilderness Areas
- Wilderness Act
