= New Harmony, Utah =

Town in the state of Utah, United States

- Town
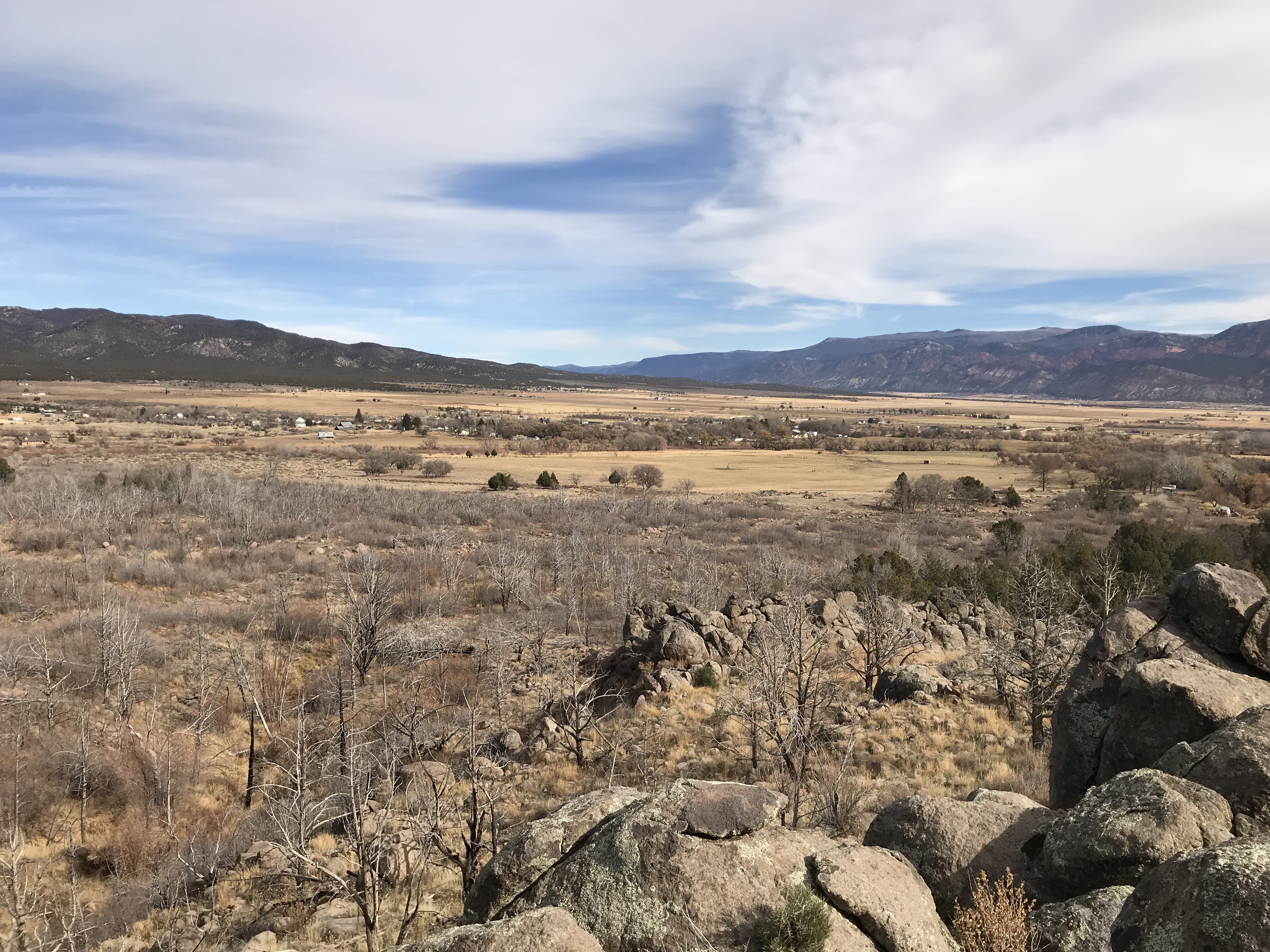
- New Harmony, November 2017

- Location in Washington County and the state of Utah
- Coordinates: 37°28′49″N 113°18′34″W
- Country: United States
- State: Utah
- County: Washington
- settlement, Incorporated: 1862; 1936
- Named for: Harmony, Pennsylvania

Area
  - Total: 0.61 sq mi (1.59 km^{2})
  - Land: 0.61 sq mi (1.59 km^{2})
  - Water: 0 sq mi (0.00 km^{2})
- Elevation: 5,319 ft (1,621 m)

Population (2020)
  - Total: 236
  - Density: 382/sq mi (147.5/km^{2})
- Time zone: UTC-7 (Mountain (MST))
  - Summer (DST): UTC-6 (MDT)
- ZIP code: 84757
- Area code: 435
- FIPS code: 49-54440
- GNIS feature ID: 2413044
- Website: newharmony.utah.gov

New Harmony is a town in northern Washington County, Utah, United States. The population was 236 at the 2020 census.

== History ==
The town was originally settled as part of efforts to mine and refine iron in the area. Settlers built a crude foundry in 1852, but abandoned it soon after due to transport and logistics issues.

The town of New Harmony was settled in 1862, by families driven from Fort Harmony when the fort had to be abandoned after most of its adobe walls were washed away during a month of heavy rains in January and February, during the Great Flood of 1862.

== Demographics ==
Historical population
Census	Pop.	Note	%±
1860	74		—
1870	243		228.4%
1880	150		−38.3%
1890	102		−32.0%
1900	119		16.7%
1910	105		−11.8%
1920	157		49.5%
1930	169		7.6%
1940	170		0.6%
1950	126		−25.9%
1960	105		−16.7%
1970	78		−25.7%
1980	117		50.0%
1990	101		−13.7%
2000	190		88.1%
2010	207		8.9%
2020	236		14.0%
U.S. Decennial Census

As of the census of 2000, there were 190 people, 69 households, and 58 families residing in the town. The population density was 473.8 people per square mile (183.4/km^{2}). There were 86 housing units at an average density of 214.5 per square mile (83.0/km^{2}). The racial makeup of the town was 98.95% White, 0.53% Native American, and 0.53% from two or more races. Hispanic or Latino of any race were 2.63% of the population.

There were 69 households, out of which 24.6% had children under the age of 18 living with them, 71.0% were married couples living together, 8.7% had a female householder with no husband present, and 14.5% were non-families. 14.5% of all households were made up of individuals, and 8.7% had someone living alone who was 65 years of age or older. The average household size was 2.75 and the average family size was 3.05.

In the town, the population was spread out, with 25.8% under the age of 18, 6.8% from 18 to 24, 18.9% from 25 to 44, 25.3% from 45 to 64, and 23.2% who were 65 years of age or older. The median age was 43 years. For every 100 females, there were 115.9 males. For every 100 females age 18 and over, there were 110.4 males.

The median income for a household in the town was $34,583, and the median income for a family was $36,250. Males had a median income of $23,750 versus $11,875 for females. The per capita income for the town was $17,133. About 15.6% of families and 14.1% of the population were below the poverty line, including 16.3% of those under the age of eighteen and 18.2% of those 65 or over.

== Geography and climate ==
According to the United States Census Bureau, the town has a total area of 0.4 square miles (1.0 km^{2}), all land.

New Harmony's Köppen climate classification is Csa (Hot-summer mediterranean).

The natural vegetation in the immediate vicinity of New Harmony is pinyon-juniper woodland.

The boundary of the Pine Valley Mountain Wilderness lies less than a mile outside of the New Harmony city limits.

New Harmony lies in the watershed of Ash Creek and is therefore in the Colorado River basin. It lies in or near the Basin and Range - Colorado Plateau Transition Zone.

Climate data for New Harmony, UT (1948 to 2006)
Month	Jan	Feb	Mar	Apr	May	Jun	Jul	Aug	Sep	Oct	Nov	Dec	Year
Record high °F (°C)	67 (19)	76 (24)	80 (27)	85 (29)	95 (35)	100 (38)	104 (40)	101 (38)	94 (34)	88 (31)	78 (26)	69 (21)	104 (40)
Mean daily maximum °F (°C)	45.0 (7.2)	48.8 (9.3)	54.8 (12.7)	62.9 (17.2)	72.7 (22.6)	83.1 (28.4)	89.0 (31.7)	86.5 (30.3)	79.5 (26.4)	68.8 (20.4)	54.6 (12.6)	45.9 (7.7)	66.0 (18.9)
Mean daily minimum °F (°C)	21.2 (−6.0)	24.4 (−4.2)	28.6 (−1.9)	34.3 (1.3)	42.1 (5.6)	50.7 (10.4)	58.4 (14.7)	57.1 (13.9)	49.2 (9.6)	38.8 (3.8)	28.0 (−2.2)	21.6 (−5.8)	37.9 (3.3)
Record low °F (°C)	−11 (−24)	−20 (−29)	0 (−18)	12 (−11)	23 (−5)	29 (−2)	40 (4)	36 (2)	23 (−5)	6 (−14)	3 (−16)	−19 (−28)	−20 (−29)
Average precipitation inches (mm)	2.16 (55)	2.21 (56)	2.18 (55)	1.17 (30)	0.86 (22)	0.57 (14)	1.15 (29)	1.62 (41)	1.26 (32)	1.39 (35)	1.52 (39)	1.51 (38)	17.59 (447)
Average snowfall inches (cm)	11.8 (30)	8.0 (20)	7.2 (18)	1.5 (3.8)	0.0 (0.0)	0.0 (0.0)	0.0 (0.0)	0.0 (0.0)	0.0 (0.0)	0.3 (0.76)	2.5 (6.4)	5.7 (14)	37.2 (94)
Average precipitation days (≥ 0.01 in)	5	5	6	5	4	2	4	6	4	4	4	4	53
Source 1: Western Regional Climate Center
Source 2: Western Regional Climate Center

== See also ==
- List of cities and towns in Utah
