= Springdale, Utah =

Town in the state of Utah, United States

- Town
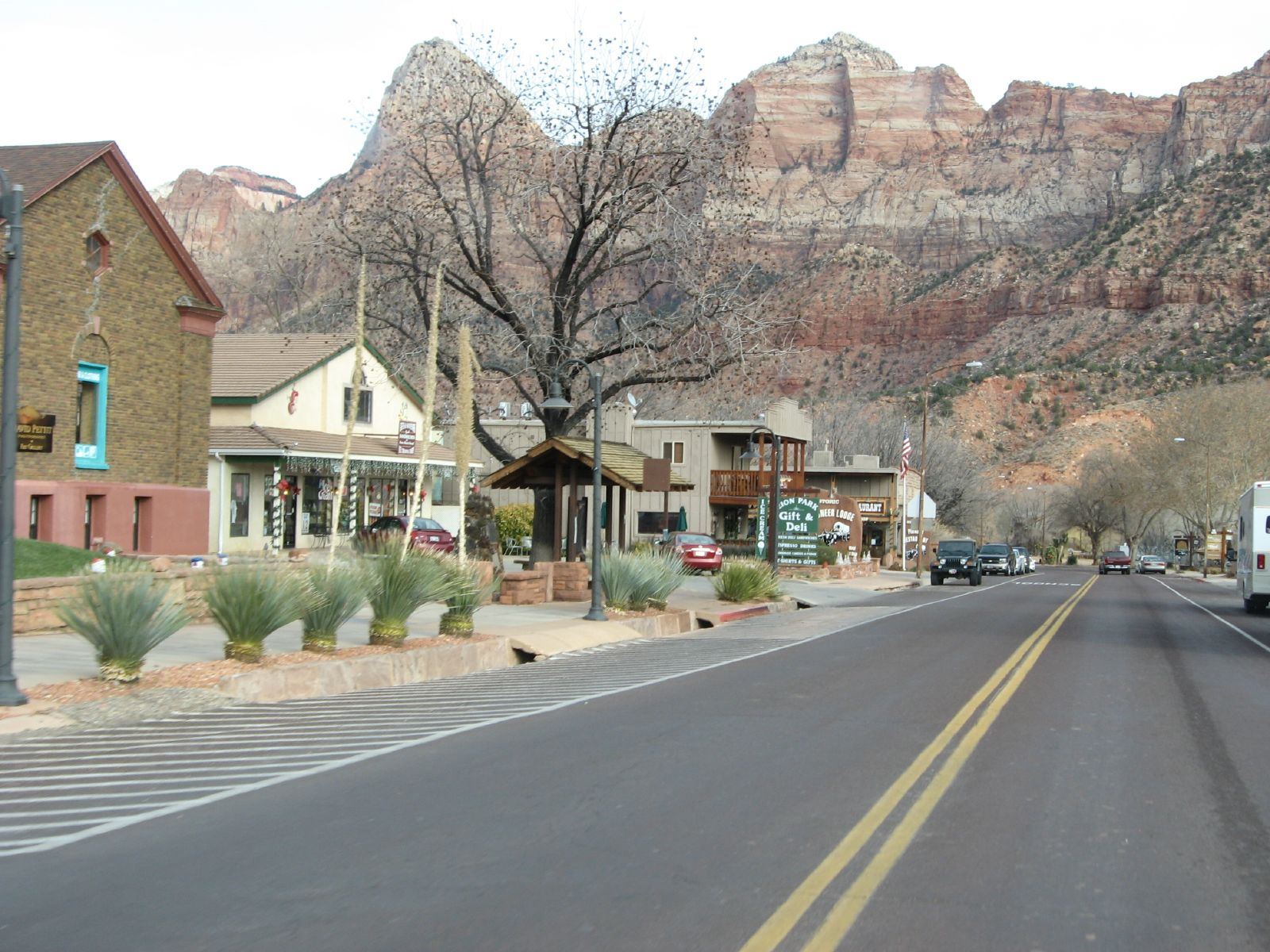

- Location in Washington County and the state of Utah
- Coordinates: 37°11′04″N 112°13′00″W
- Country: United States
- State: Utah
- County: Washington
- Settled: 1862
- Named for: Springs

Government
  - Mayor: Barbara Bruno
  - Council members: Randy Aton, Pat Campbell, Kyla Topham, Jack Burns

Area
  - Total: 4.62 sq mi (11.96 km^{2})
  - Land: 4.62 sq mi (11.96 km^{2})
  - Water: 0 sq mi (0.00 km^{2})
- Elevation: 3,855 ft (1,175 m)

Population (2020)
  - Total: 514
  - Density: 136/sq mi (52.6/km^{2})
- Time zone: UTC-7 (Mountain (MST))
  - Summer (DST): UTC-6 (MDT)
- ZIP codes: 84767, 84779
- Area code: 435
- FIPS code: 49-71840
- GNIS feature ID: 2413319
- Website: www.springdale.utah.gov

Springdale is a town in Washington County, Utah, United States. The population was 514 at the 2020 census. It is located adjacent to the boundaries of Zion National Park. It was originally settled as a Mormon farming community in 1862 by evacuees from the flooding of nearby Northrop.

== History ==
The 1992 St. George earthquake destroyed three houses as well as above- and below-ground utilities, causing about US$1 million in damage. In the Balanced Rock Hills area of Springdale, a landslide covered part of Utah State Route 9, taking several hours to clear. The slide was approximately 1,600 feet (490 m) long and 3,600 feet (1,100 m) wide, contained boulders up to 20 feet (6.1 m) in diameter, with a total volume of 18,000,000 cubic yards (14,000,000 m^{3}) and total area of 4,400,400 square feet (408,810 m^{2}).

== Geography ==
According to the United States Census Bureau, the town has a total area of 4.6 square miles (12.0 km^{2}), all land. Springdale is set in Zion Canyon with Mount Kinesava to the west, and The Watchman to the east. The North Fork Virgin River courses through town shortly before the confluence with the Virgin's East Fork.

Springdale sits at the western edge of the Colorado Plateau, in the transition zone between the plateau, the Great Basin and the Mojave Desert.

Springdale acts as a gateway community for Zion National Park.

== Demographics ==
Historical population
Census	Pop.	Note	%±
1880	50		—
1890	73		46.0%
1900	144		97.3%
1910	186		29.2%
1920	204		9.7%
1930	351		72.1%
1940	454		29.3%
1950	174		−61.7%
1960	248		42.5%
1970	182		−26.6%
1980	258		41.8%
1990	275		6.6%
2000	457		66.2%
2010	529		15.8%
2020	514		−2.8%
U.S. Decennial Census

Springdale town, Utah – Racial composition Note: the US Census treats Hispanic/Latino as an ethnic category. This table excludes Latinos from the racial categories and assigns them to a separate category. Hispanics/Latinos may be of any race.
Race (NH = Non-Hispanic)	% 2020	% 2010	% 2000	Pop 2020	Pop 2010	Pop 2000
White alone (NH)	83.3%	85.6%	86.2%	428	453	394
Black alone (NH)	0.6%	0.9%	0%	3	5	0
American Indian alone (NH)	0.6%	0.6%	1.8%	3	3	8
Asian alone (NH)	1%	0.8%	0.7%	5	4	3
Pacific Islander alone (NH)	0.2%	0%	0%	1	0	0
Other race alone (NH)	1%	0%	0%	5	0	0
Multiracial (NH)	2.5%	0.9%	0%	13	5	0
Hispanic/Latino (any race)	10.9%	11.2%	11.4%	56	59	52

As of the census of 2010, there were 529 people, 252 households, and 137 families residing in the town. The population density was 115 people per square mile (44.1/km^{2}). There were 327 housing units at an average density of 71.1 per square mile (27.3/km^{2}). The racial makeup of the town was 90.2% White, 0.9% African American, 0.6% Native American, 0.8% Asian, 5.7% from other races, and 1.9% from two or more races. Hispanic or Latino of any race were 11.2% of the population.

There were 252 households, out of which 15.1% had children under the age of 18 living with them, 44.0% were married couples living together, 6.7% had a female householder with no husband present, and 45.6% were non-families. 34.2% of all households were made up of individuals, and 8.7% had someone living alone who was 65 years of age or older. The average household size was 2.38 and the average family size was 2.67.

In the town, the population was spread out, with 15.3% under the age of 18, 4.5% from 20 to 24, 24.2% from 25 to 44, 35.4% from 45 to 64, and 18.9% who were 65 years of age or older. The median age was 47.8 years. For every 100 females, there were 106.6 males. For every 100 women age 18 and over, there were 106.5 men.

As of 2000, the median income for a household in the town was $41,607, and the median income for a family was $51,500. Males had a median income of $34,063 versus $26,667 for females. The per capita income for the town was $25,593. About 8.3% of families and 9.0% of the population were below the poverty line, including 12.0% of those under age 18 and 12.3% of those age 65 or over.

== Government ==
The mayor is Barbara Bruno, and the council members are Randy Aton, Pat Campbell, Jack Burns, and Kyla Topham.

== Education ==
Washington County School District is the school district in all of the county.
