= Fort Harmony, Utah =

Coordinates: 37°28′50″N 113°14′36″W

Fort Harmony was an early settlement on the northern edge of Washington County, Utah, United States, now a ghost town.

== Description ==
The settlement was founded in 1852. Among the settlers there was John D. Lee. It was also the original headquarters of the Church of Jesus Christ of Latter-day Saints's Southern Indian Mission.

Settlers were driven from Fort Harmony when the fort had to be abandoned after most of its adobe walls were washed away after the month long rains during the Great Flood of 1862. New Harmony and Kanarraville, in Iron County were the settlements created by refugees from this disaster later in 1862.

== See also ==
- List of ghost towns in Utah

== Sources ==
- Ronald W. Walker, Glen M. Leonard and Richard E. Turley, Jr., Massacre at Mountain Meadows. (New York:Oxford University Press, 2008) p. 55, 67.
