= Washington County, Utah =

County in Utah, United States

- County
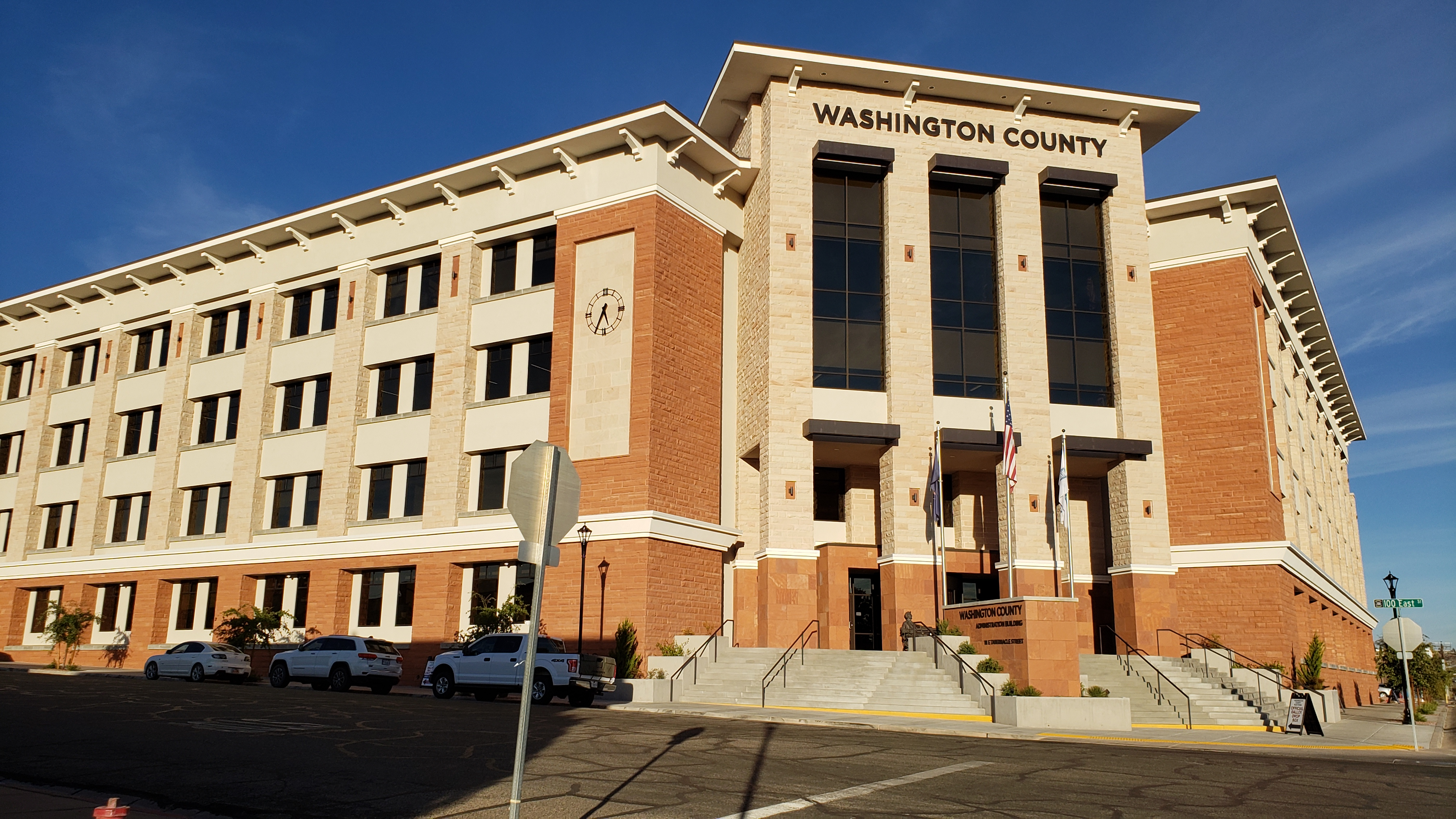
- Washington County administration building, November 2023

- Location within the U.S. state of Utah
- Coordinates: 37.28°N 113.52°W
- Country: United States
- State: Utah
- Founded: March 3, 1852
- Named for: George Washington
- Seat: St. George
- Largest city: St. George

Area
  - Total: 2,430 sq mi (6,300 km^{2})
  - Land: 2,426 sq mi (6,280 km^{2})
  - Water: 3.6 sq mi (9.3 km^{2}) 0.1%

Population (2020)
  - Total: 180,279
  - Estimate (2025): 213,670 ▲
  - Density: 74.31/sq mi (28.69/km^{2})
- Time zone: UTC−7 (Mountain)
  - Summer (DST): UTC−6 (MDT)
- Congressional district: 2nd
- Website: www.washco.state.ut.us

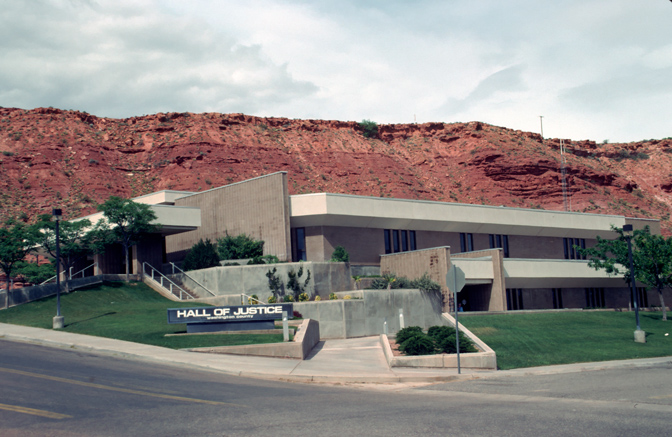
Washington County Hall of Justice, May 1992

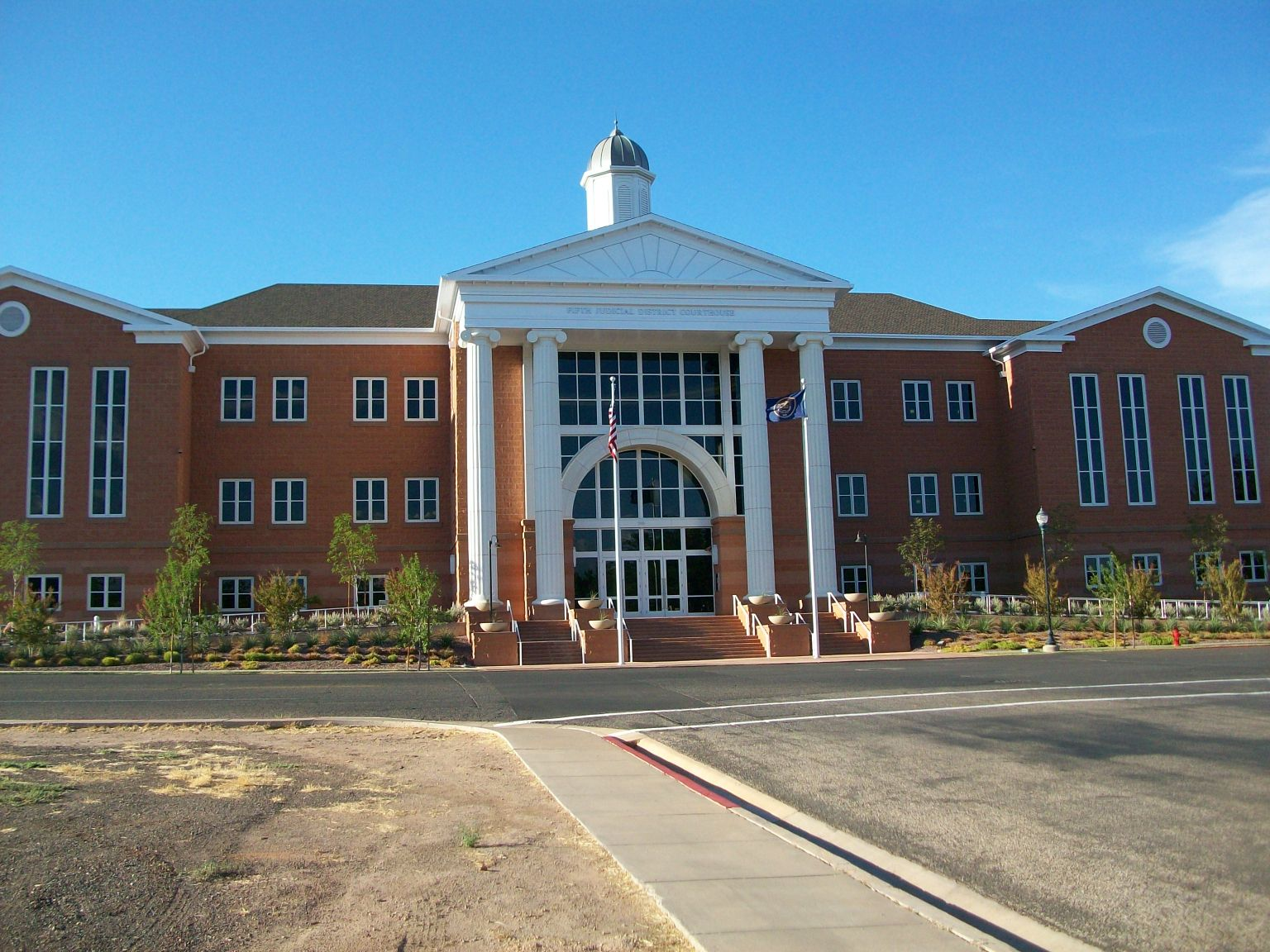
Washington County 5th District Courthouse, 2010

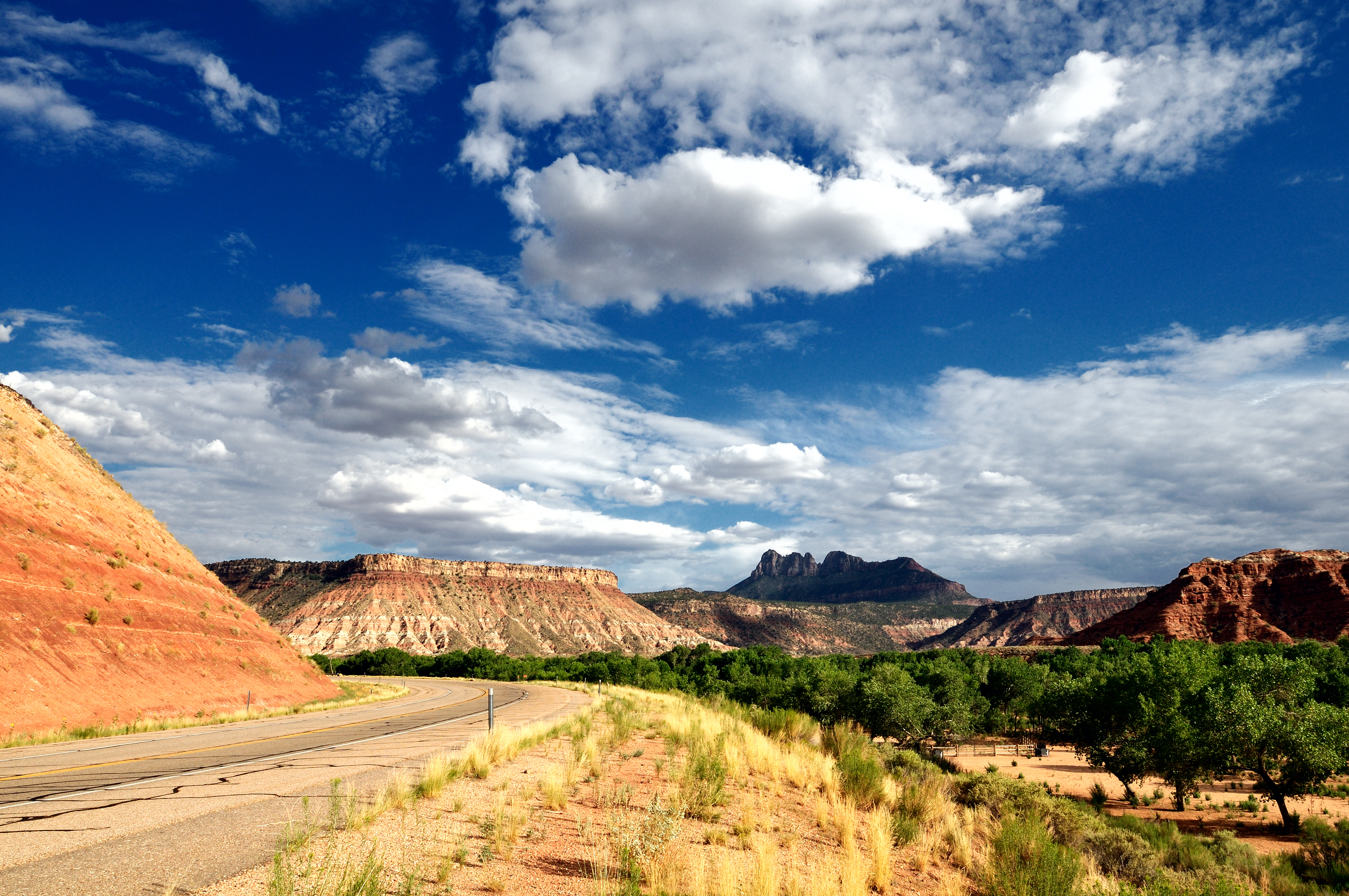
Road to Zion National Park

Washington County is a county in the southwestern corner of Utah, United States. As of the 2020 United States census, the population was 180,279, making it the fifth-most populous county in Utah. Its county seat and largest city is St. George. The county was created in 1852 and organized in 1856. It was named after the first President of the United States, George Washington. A portion of the Paiute Indian Reservation is in western Washington County. Washington County comprises the St. George, UT Metropolitan Statistical Area.

== History ==
The earliest settlement was Fort Harmony in 1852. Santa Clara was established in 1854 as a mission to the natives who lived on the Santa Clara River. Hamblin and Pinto were settled along the Los Angeles - Salt Lake Road in 1856, as was Gunlock in 1857.

Next came the settlements established as colonies to grow cotton before the beginning of the American Civil War (1861-1865). They were located along the Virgin River, in the warmer climate below the central Great Basin, which was for decades called "Utah's Dixie". The first settlement was Virgin, and Washington in 1857. Heberville, Pintura and Toquerville followed in 1858, Grafton, Harrisburg and Pine Valley in 1859, Adventure in 1860, Duncans Retreat, Northrop, Shonesburg and St. George in 1861.

Fort Harmony, Adventure, and Northrup were abandoned, and Santa Clara, St. George, Washington, Harrisburg, Heberville, Grafton, and Duncans Retreat were nearly destroyed by the Great Flood of 1862 that followed 44 days of rainfall in January and February 1862. New Harmony, Springdale and Rockville were founded in 1862 by settlers flooded out of Fort Harmony, Adventure, Northrup and other places in the vicinity. Harrisburg was relocated.

Shoal Creek later called Hebron, was a ranching community established in 1862 west of the county. Leeds was settled in 1867, and Silver Reef was a mining town begun in 1875 and abandoned by 1891 due to the collapse in silver prices.

The old federal Utah Territory's territorial legislature created Washington County on March 3, 1852, in the southern border area of the Territory, adjacent to the then old federal New Mexico Territory of 1850-1912. It was not fully organized at that time, and so it was attached to Iron County, which was adjacent to the north for temporary administrative and judicial purposes in its county seat town and courthouse of Parowan, for its first four years. This continued until February 23, 1856, when the organization was completed, Saint George was listed as the newly designated county seat and site of a courthouse, and the attachment to Iron County was terminated. The county boundaries were altered a dozen times after that; but its boundaries have retained their present configuration since March 10, 1892, four years before statehood was achieved in 1896.

== Geography ==
Washington County lies in the southwest corner of Utah. Its south border abuts the northern border of the state of Arizona, and its west border abuts the east border of the state of Nevada. Its terrain is rough and arid, with a little area devoted to agriculture. It is a mixture of mountains and flat stretches. The terrain slopes to the south and west; the lowest point in the state of Utah is located in the Beaver Dam Wash in Washington County, where it (seasonally) flows out of Utah and into Arizona, at 2,178 ft (664 m) ASL. The county's highest point is Signal Peak in the Pine Valley Mountains, at 10,369 ft (3,160 m) ASL. The county has a total area of 2,430 square miles (6,300 km^{2}), of which 2,426 square miles (6,280 km^{2}) is land and 3.6 square miles (9.3 km^{2}) (comprising 0.1%) is water.

Washington County is made up of three major geographic areas; the Colorado Plateau in the east-northeast, the Great Basin in the northwest, and the Mojave Desert in the south-southwest.

=== Greater St. George ===
Most of the population is centered in the south-central part of the county near the Arizona border around St. George. Most national shopping, dining, and hospitality chains are located here, along with several local businesses. The climate of this section of the county is typical of the Mojave Desert in which it lies; its annual rainfall is 8 inches, and it is the lowest elevation in Washington County, making it particularly hot and dry compared to the rest of the county. Most homes are located in subdivisions characteristic of a growing urban sprawl. In Downtown St. George, several local restaurants and stores call the area home, and despite its small size, it tends to attract many locals and tourists alike. To combat the sprawl (which threatens many nature reserves and increases congestion), growth and promotion are projected inward to the central area of St. George, with many new infill developments being planned and constructed. The center of the city, or downtown, also contains Utah Tech University, the only four-year college within a 50-mile (80 km) radius. Dixie High School is also located in the downtown area.

Most commercial and industrial lots exist in the eastern portion of the Greater St. George Area in eastern St. George and Washington. Rapidly expanding suburbs also exist there, especially in an area known as Washington Fields. Large irrigated farms have been sold to commercial and residential developers to make way for the anticipated need for more housing and business. Pine View High School is in this section and serves the east side and Washington. To accommodate the rapidly expanding population, an additional high school (Crimson Cliffs High School) has been built in the Washington Fields area.

The western portion of the urban area contains the suburbs of Santa Clara and Ivins, and the neighborhoods of Green Valley, Dixie Downs, Sunset, and Tonaquint. Due to this area's proximity to Snow Canyon State Park, this has resulted in the construction of many resort-style communities and gated subdivisions such as Entrada, Kayenta, and the Palisades, with homes often exceeding $1,000,000 in price. However, there are still many other neighborhoods and older houses that tend to be more affordable. This section is served by Snow Canyon High School.

The southern portion of the city contains the neighborhoods of Southgate, Bloomington, Bloomington Hills, SunRiver, Desert's Edge (near the airport), and Hidden Valley and is served by Desert Hills High School. Limitations on development in this area exist due to terrain, and as such, it contains less population than its east and west counterparts. The SR-7 freeway, also known as Southern Parkway, has been built as a beltway to accommodate future growth in the southeastern portion of St. George and Washington. The partially constructed freeway also connects to St. George Regional Airport, and in the future, will provide a vital connection to the community of Hurricane, which will thereby provide quicker and more efficient access to Zion National Park, thus providing an alternative route to Interstate 15.

Despite its scenic location amid red sandstone, lava fields, and the backdrop of the Pine Valley Mountains, the northern area of St. George is almost entirely undeveloped due to the Red Cliffs National Conservation Area, which protects a variety of endangered wildlife and unspoiled desert. The only communities in northern St. George are The Ledges and Winchester Hills in the west, and Green Springs, near Washington, in the east. While the community of Winchester Hills has existed for many decades, The Ledges is a newer development met with significant controversy. A few houses in the gate portion feature what many consider to be multimillion-dollar views of Snow Canyon State Park and are visible from inside the state park. This has led many to believe that the beauty of Snow Canyon is in jeopardy due to the City of St. George's willingness to sell the land around the park to private companies. In reality, only three houses are visible inside the canyon, although more visible lots exist to be built upon. On the opposite end of the city is Green Springs, an upscale multimillion-dollar development that consists of a golf course and many distinct gated and non-gated housing communities.

On the east side of the metropolitan area lies the cities of Hurricane and La Verkin. Because this locale is disconnected from the rest of the area by undeveloped swaths of land, it is still usually considered distinct from urban St. George, though this may change in the future due to anticipated development that will connect these cities. This area is more farm-based and rural than St. George, but is still experiencing rapid expansion in commercial, industrial, and residential development like the rest of the region. It is served by Hurricane High School.

=== Outside the urban area ===
While the entire county, due to its large size, is considered part of the St. George Metropolitan Area, most land in the county is rural.

In the middle and north of Washington County, a sparse population exists. The center-county communities of Central and Pine Valley are popular resort communities and contain many cabins and recreational parks due to their locations in Dixie National Forest and the Pine Valley Mountains. Veyo and Dammeron Valley, also near the center of the county, are primarily ranching towns, with most houses situated on large plots of land. This central area of Washington County is generally more wet and humid than the rest of the county due to its high elevation and high precipitation. In Pine Valley, precipitation often exceeds 20 inches per year.

The northern portion of Washington County is semi-arid and dry, albeit less so than in the southern portion. The only incorporated town in this area is Enterprise with a population of just over 1,700. Enterprise is the home of the only secondary school outside of the Greater St. George Area, Enterprise High School. The town contains a small grocery store and multiple gas stations but is very quaint and rural when compared to the urban area of St. George.

Western Washington County is home to Gunlock; also a ranching town, and a small Native American reserve named Shivwits, occupied by the Shivwits Band of Paiutes. This area of the county is also the location of the lowest area of the state, Beaver Dam Wash.

Eastern Washington County is also sparsely populated. However, the towns of Rockville and Springdale are filled with major hotels and resorts, despite their small sizes. This is due to their extreme proximity to Zion National Park, one of the most visited national parks in the United States. Springdale, in particular, contains many kitschy shopping and dining options. Most of the income in these two towns is fueled by tourism alone.

The county includes an area along the Old Spanish Trail called Mountain Meadows, just south of Enterprise on SR-18. Zion National Park is located in the eastern part of Washington County.

=== Major highways ===
- Interstate 15
- State Route 7
- State Route 9
- State Route 17
- State Route 18
- State Route 59
- State Route 219

=== Adjacent counties ===
- Iron County - north
- Kane County - east
- Mohave County, Arizona - south
- Lincoln County, Nevada - west

=== Protected areas ===
- Beaver Dam Wash National Conservation Area
- Dixie National Forest (part)
- Quail Creek State Park
- Red Cliffs National Conservation Area
- Sand Hollow State Park
- Snow Canyon State Park
- Zion National Park (part)

There are 18 official wilderness areas in Washington County that are part of the National Wilderness Preservation System. Most are entities managed by the Bureau of Land Management, but some are integral parts of the above-listed protected areas. Two of these extend into neighboring counties (as indicated below). Many of the BLM wildernesses are not much more than small appendages of Zion Wilderness in Zion National Park:

- Beartrap Canyon Wilderness (BLM)
- Beaver Dam Mountains Wilderness (BLM) (part)
- Blackridge Wilderness (BLM)
- Canaan Mountain Wilderness (BLM)
- Cottonwood Canyon Wilderness (Red Cliffs NCA, managed by BLM)
- Cottonwood Forest Wilderness (Dixie National Forest)
- Cougar Canyon Wilderness (BLM)
- Deep Creek North Wilderness (BLM)
- Deep Creek Wilderness (BLM)
- Doc's Pass Wilderness (BLM)
- Goose Creek Wilderness (BLM)
- LaVerkin Creek Wilderness (BLM)
- Pine Valley Mountain Wilderness (Dixie National Forest)
- Red Butte Wilderness (BLM)
- Red Mountain Wilderness (Red Cliffs NCA, managed by BLM)
- Slaughter Creek Wilderness (BLM)
- Taylor Creek Wilderness (BLM)
- Zion Wilderness (Zion NP) (part)

== Demographics ==
Historical population
| Census | Pop. | Note | %± |
|---|---|---|---|
| 1860 | 691 | | — |
| 1870 | 3,064 | | 343.4% |
| 1880 | 4,235 | | 38.2% |
| 1890 | 4,009 | | −5.3% |
| 1900 | 4,612 | | 15.0% |
| 1910 | 5,123 | | 11.1% |
| 1920 | 6,764 | | 32.0% |
| 1930 | 7,420 | | 9.7% |
| 1940 | 9,269 | | 24.9% |
| 1950 | 9,836 | | 6.1% |
| 1960 | 10,271 | | 4.4% |
| 1970 | 13,669 | | 33.1% |
| 1980 | 26,065 | | 90.7% |
| 1990 | 48,560 | | 86.3% |
| 2000 | 90,354 | | 86.1% |
| 2010 | 138,115 | | 52.9% |
| 2020 | 180,279 | | 30.5% |
| 2025 (est.) | 213,670 | ▲ | 18.5% |
US Decennial Census; 1790–1960 1900–1990; 1990–2000 2010–2020

=== Racial and ethnic composition ===
Washington County, Utah – Racial and ethnic composition Note: the US Census treats Hispanic/Latino as an ethnic category. This table excludes Latinos from the racial categories and assigns them to a separate category. Hispanics/Latinos may be of any race.
| Race / Ethnicity (NH = Non-Hispanic) | Pop 1980 | Pop 1990 | Pop 2000 | Pop 2010 | Pop 2020 | % 1980 | % 1990 | % 2000 | % 2010 | % 2020 |
|---|---|---|---|---|---|---|---|---|---|---|
| White alone (NH) | 25,404 | 46,665 | 82,293 | 118,282 | 147,462 | 97.46% | 96.10% | 91.08% | 85.64% | 81.80% |
| Black or African American alone (NH) | 12 | 63 | 174 | 632 | 913 | 0.05% | 0.13% | 0.19% | 0.46% | 0.51% |
| Native American or Alaska Native alone (NH) | 255 | 678 | 1,229 | 1,460 | 1,566 | 0.98% | 1.40% | 1.36% | 1.06% | 0.87% |
| Asian alone (NH) | 75 | 276 | 389 | 954 | 1,802 | 0.29% | 0.57% | 0.43% | 0.69% | 1.00% |
| Native Hawaiian or Pacific Islander alone (NH) | x | x | 379 | 1,022 | 1,607 | x | x | 0.42% | 0.74% | 0.89% |
| Other race alone (NH) | 21 | 16 | 87 | 93 | 631 | 0.08% | 0.03% | 0.10% | 0.07% | 0.35% |
| Mixed race or Multiracial (NH) | x | x | 1,076 | 2,186 | 5,816 | x | x | 1.19% | 1.58% | 3.23% |
| Hispanic or Latino (any race) | 298 | 862 | 4,727 | 13,486 | 20,482 | 1.14% | 1.78% | 5.23% | 9.76% | 11.36% |
| Total | 26,065 | 48,560 | 90,354 | 138,115 | 180,279 | 100.00% | 100.00% | 100.00% | 100.00% | 100.00% |

=== 2020 census ===
According to the 2020 United States census and 2020 American Community Survey, there were 180,279 people in Washington County with a population density of 74.3 people per square mile (28.7/km^{2}). Among non-Hispanic or Latino people, the racial makeup was 147,462 (81.8%) White, 913 (0.5%) African American, 1,566 (0.9%) Native American, 1,802 (1.0%) Asian, 1,607 (0.9%) Pacific Islander, 631 (0.4%) from other races, and 5,816 (3.2%) from two or more races. 20,482 (11.4%) people were Hispanic or Latino.

There were 89,115 (49.43%) males and 91,164 (50.57%) females, and the population distribution by age was 47,542 (26.4%) under the age of 18, 92,818 (51.5%) from 18 to 64, and 39,919 (22.1%) who were at least 65 years old. The median age was 37.6 years.

There were 62,416 households in Washington County with an average size of 2.89 of which 46,724 (74.9%) were families and 15,692 (25.1%) were non-families. Among all families, 38,423 (61.6%) were married couples, 2,728 (4.4%) were male householders with no spouse, and 5,573 (8.9%) were female householders with no spouse. Among all non-families, 12,372 (19.8%) were a single person living alone and 3,320 (5.3%) were two or more people living together. 20,177 (32.3%) of all households had children under the age of 18. 45,539 (73.0%) of households were owner-occupied while 16,877 (27.0%) were renter-occupied.

The median income for a Washington County household was $61,747 and the median family income was $72,683, with a per-capita income of $29,886. The median income for males that were full-time employees was $50,029 and for females $36,844. 10.0% of the population and 7.2% of families were below the poverty line.

In terms of education attainment, out of the 112,121 people in Washington County 25 years or older, 6,908 (6.2%) had not completed high school, 25,232 (22.5%) had a high school diploma or equivalency, 47,254 (42.1%) had some college or associate degree, 20,939 (18.7%) had a bachelor's degree, and 11,788 (10.5%) had a graduate or professional degree.

=== Religion ===
In 2000, 92.5% of residents were adherents of the Church of Jesus Christ of Latter-day Saints; 4.1% Catholic; 0.8% Southern Baptist; 0.6% Presbyterian; 0.4% Lutheran; 0.4% Episcopal; 0.2% United Methodist; 0.2% Baptist; 0.2% Assemblies of God; and 0.5% Other.

=== Ancestry ===
As of 2015, the largest European self-reported ancestry groups in Washington County are:

| Largest ancestries (2015) | Percent |
|---|---|
| English | 28.7% |
| German | 11.5% |
| Irish | 7.4% |
| Swedish | 4.3% |
| Danish | 4.3% |
| Scottish | 3.5% |
| Italian | 3.2% |
| Dutch | 2.5% |
| Swiss | 2.2% |
| Norwegian | 2.0% |
| French (except Basque) | 2.0% |
| Polish | 1.2% |
| Welsh | 1.1% |
| Scots-Irish | 1.0% |

== Education ==
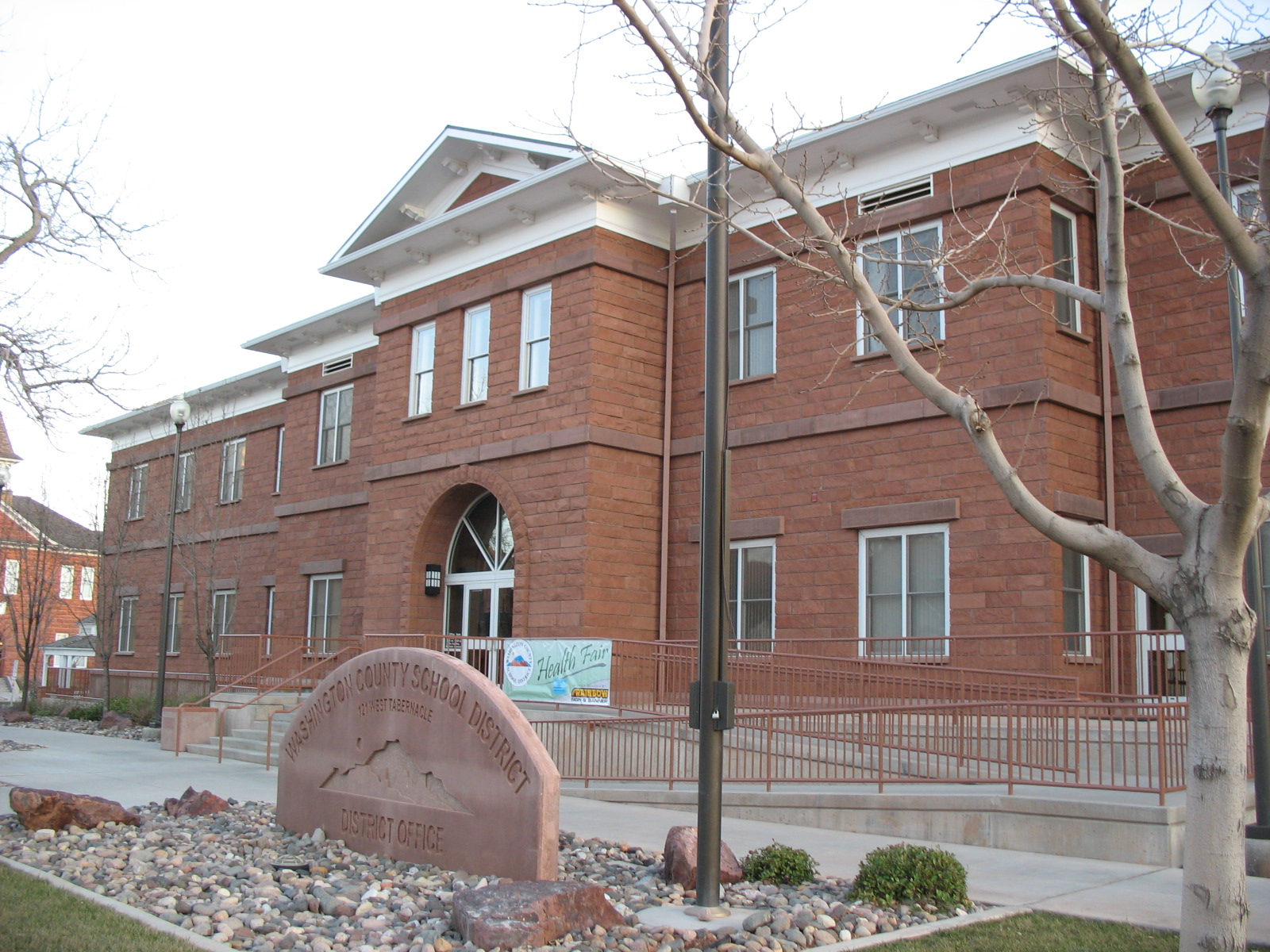
Washington County School District Office in St. George, Utah

The Washington County School District covers the entire county.

Washington County is home to Utah Tech University in St. George, with campus extensions in Hurricane and Hildale (Water Canyon Center).

== Utilities ==
Retail utility companies operating in Washington County include city water and power departments, Dixie Power, Rocky Mountain Power, Dominion Energy (natural gas), Washington County Water Conservancy District, Mountain Springs Water Company in New Harmony, and the East Zion Special Service District.

== Communities ==
=== Cities ===
- Enterprise
- Hildale
- Hurricane
- Ivins
- La Verkin
- Santa Clara
- St. George (county seat)
- Toquerville
- Washington

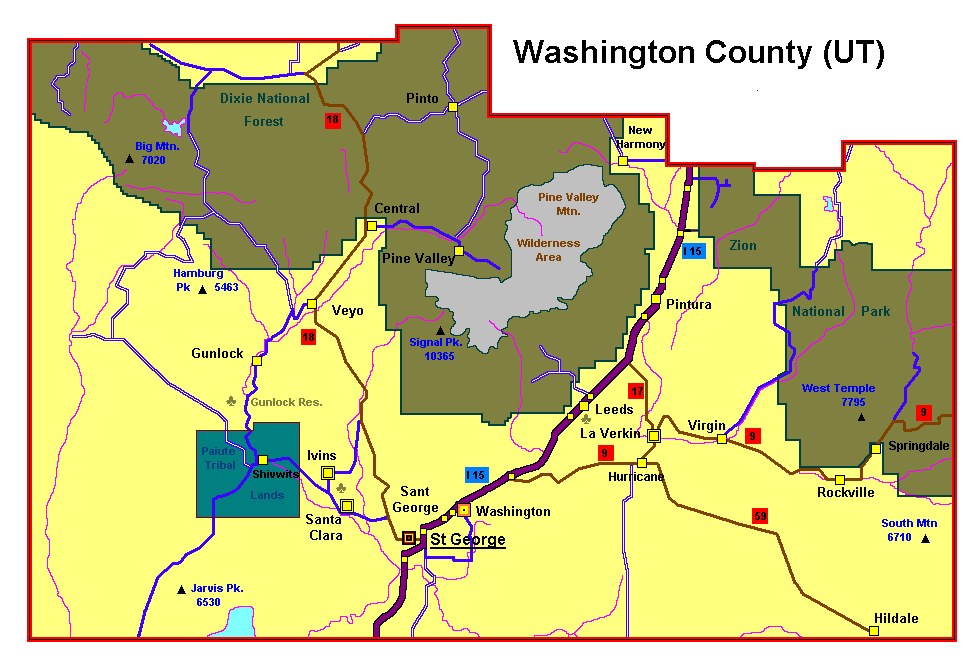
Washington County (UT) cities and towns

Incorporated and unincorporated area boundaries

=== Towns ===
- Apple Valley
- Leeds
- New Harmony
- Rockville
- Springdale
- Virgin

=== Census-designated places ===
- Central
- Dammeron Valley
- Pine Valley
- Veyo

=== Unincorporated communities ===
- Brookside
- Diamond Valley
- Gunlock
- Motoqua
- Pinto
- Pintura
- Shivwits

=== Former communities ===
- Adventure
- Atkinville (absorbed into Saint George)
- Bloomington (absorbed into Saint George)
- Duncan's Retreat
- Fort Harmony
- Grafton
- Hamblin
- Harrisburg (absorbed into Hurricane)
- Hebron
- Middleton (absorbed into Saint George)
- Northrop (absorbed into Springdale)
- Price City (originally named Heberville; absorbed into Saint George)
- Shem
- Shunesburg (or Shonesburg)
- Silver Reef (absorbed into Leeds)
- Tonaquint (absorbed into Saint George)

== Politics and government ==
United States presidential election results for Washington County, Utah
| Year | Republican | | Democratic | | Third party(ies) | |
| Year | No. | % | No. | % | No. | % |
|---|---|---|---|---|---|---|
| 1896 | 170 | 12.32% | 1,210 | 87.68% | 0 | 0.00% |
| 1900 | 409 | 28.93% | 1,003 | 70.93% | 2 | 0.14% |
| 1904 | 718 | 48.38% | 761 | 51.28% | 5 | 0.34% |
| 1908 | 740 | 47.56% | 810 | 52.06% | 6 | 0.39% |
| 1912 | 712 | 43.60% | 842 | 51.56% | 79 | 4.84% |
| 1916 | 703 | 33.41% | 1,397 | 66.40% | 4 | 0.19% |
| 1920 | 1,138 | 52.78% | 1,008 | 46.75% | 10 | 0.46% |
| 1924 | 1,181 | 54.96% | 868 | 40.39% | 100 | 4.65% |
| 1928 | 1,686 | 66.20% | 857 | 33.65% | 4 | 0.16% |
| 1932 | 1,378 | 45.22% | 1,648 | 54.09% | 21 | 0.69% |
| 1936 | 1,145 | 36.19% | 2,005 | 63.37% | 14 | 0.44% |
| 1940 | 1,625 | 44.88% | 1,993 | 55.04% | 3 | 0.08% |
| 1944 | 1,575 | 48.17% | 1,694 | 51.80% | 1 | 0.03% |
| 1948 | 2,029 | 56.10% | 1,580 | 43.68% | 8 | 0.22% |
| 1952 | 2,941 | 73.21% | 1,076 | 26.79% | 0 | 0.00% |
| 1956 | 3,172 | 78.34% | 877 | 21.66% | 0 | 0.00% |
| 1960 | 2,876 | 68.90% | 1,298 | 31.10% | 0 | 0.00% |
| 1964 | 2,534 | 58.62% | 1,789 | 41.38% | 0 | 0.00% |
| 1968 | 3,226 | 64.52% | 975 | 19.50% | 799 | 15.98% |
| 1972 | 5,176 | 77.69% | 956 | 14.35% | 530 | 7.96% |
| 1976 | 5,944 | 70.64% | 1,893 | 22.50% | 577 | 6.86% |
| 1980 | 10,181 | 83.47% | 1,678 | 13.76% | 338 | 2.77% |
| 1984 | 12,049 | 86.21% | 1,846 | 13.21% | 82 | 0.59% |
| 1988 | 13,306 | 80.33% | 3,054 | 18.44% | 205 | 1.24% |
| 1992 | 11,310 | 52.66% | 3,364 | 15.66% | 6,802 | 31.67% |
| 1996 | 17,637 | 70.49% | 4,816 | 19.25% | 2,567 | 10.26% |
| 2000 | 25,481 | 78.50% | 5,465 | 16.84% | 1,515 | 4.67% |
| 2004 | 35,633 | 80.95% | 7,513 | 17.07% | 872 | 1.98% |
| 2008 | 37,311 | 74.57% | 10,826 | 21.64% | 1,898 | 3.79% |
| 2012 | 44,698 | 82.43% | 8,337 | 15.37% | 1,191 | 2.20% |
| 2016 | 42,650 | 68.38% | 10,288 | 16.49% | 9,433 | 15.12% |
| 2020 | 67,294 | 74.38% | 20,530 | 22.69% | 2,652 | 2.93% |
| 2024 | 73,165 | 75.23% | 22,327 | 22.96% | 1,764 | 1.81% |

Washington County has traditionally voted Republican; it voted for Franklin D. Roosevelt in all four of his elections but as of 2020 has not been carried by any Democratic presidential candidate since.

State elected offices
| Position | District | Name | Affiliation | First elected |
|---|---|---|---|---|
| Senate | 28 | Evan Vickers | Republican | 2012 |
| Senate | 29 | Don Ipson | Republican | 2008 |
| Senate | 27 | Derrin R Owens | Republican | 2020 |
| House of Representatives | 72 | Joseph Elison | Republican | 2022 |
| House of Representatives | 73 | Colin Jack | Republican | 2022 |
| House of Representatives | 74 | R. Neil Walter | Republican | 2022 |
| House of Representatives | 75 | Walt Brooks | Republican | 2016 |
| Board of Education | 15 | Joann Brinton | Republican | 2020 |

== See also ==
- National Register of Historic Places listings in Washington County, Utah
