= Virgin, Utah =

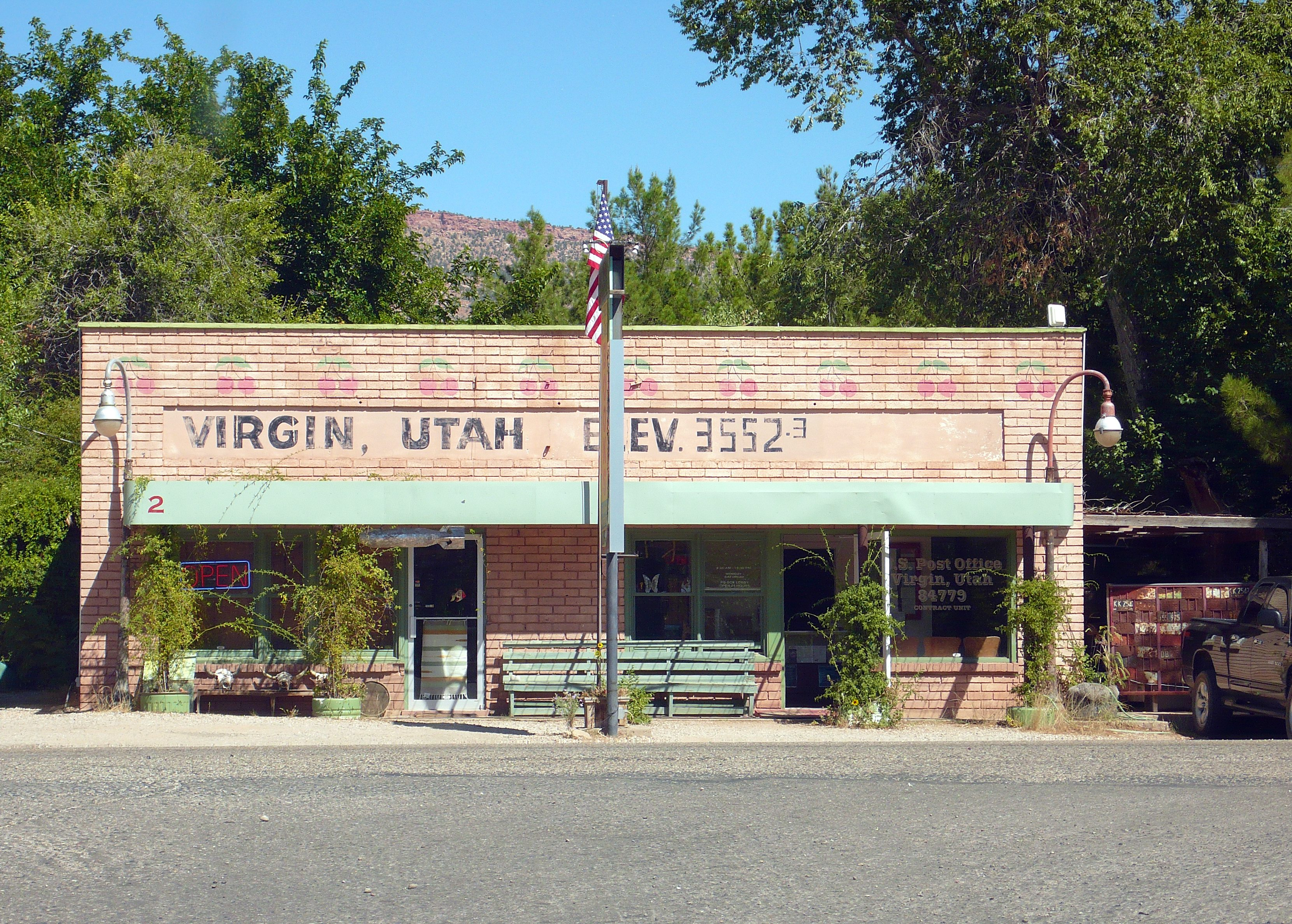
- Virgin Bookshop and Post Office

- Location in Washington County and the state of Utah
- Coordinates: 37°12′6″N 113°11′23″W
- Country: United States
- State: Utah
- County: Washington
- Settled: 1857
- Named for: Virgin River

Area
  - Total: 12.71 sq mi (32.93 km^{2})
  - Land: 12.71 sq mi (32.93 km^{2})
  - Water: 0 sq mi (0.00 km^{2})
- Elevation: 3,514 ft (1,071 m)

Population (2020)
  - Total: 670
  - Density: 51.7/sq mi (19.98/km^{2})
- Time zone: UTC-7 (Mountain (MST))
  - Summer (DST): UTC-6 (MDT)
- ZIP code: 84779
- Area code: 435
- FIPS code: 49-80530
- GNIS feature ID: 2413435
- Website: virgin.utah.gov

Virgin is a town in Washington County, Utah, United States. The population was 670 at the 2020 census. The first settlement at Virgin was made in 1858. It is located along the Virgin River (for which it is named), and not far from Zion National Park. The elevation is 3,606 feet (1,099 m). It lies on State Route 9.

== Geography ==
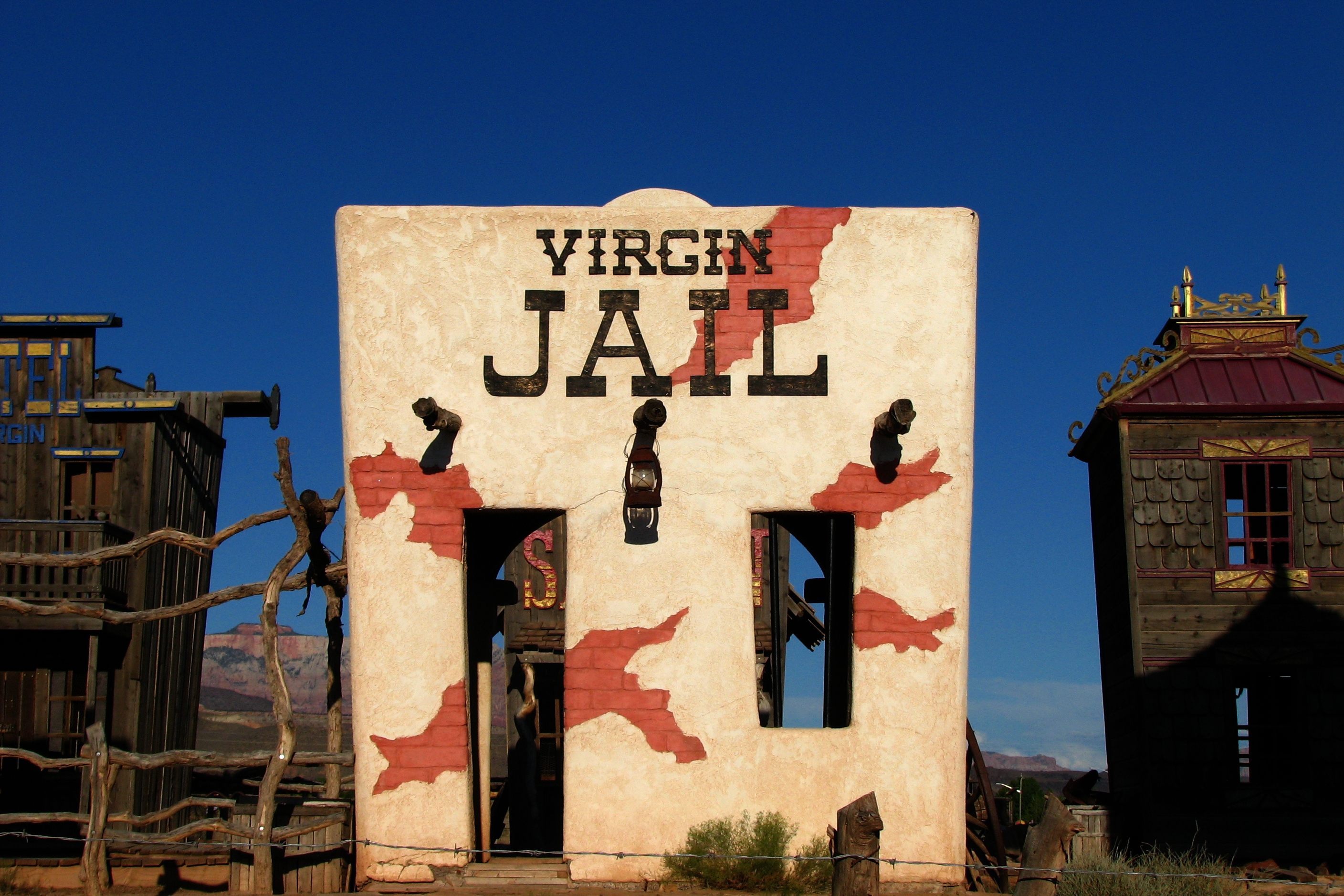

According to the United States Census Bureau, the town has an area of 11.9 square miles (30.9 km^{2}) in total, all land.

== Demographics ==
Historical population
Census	Pop.	Note	%±
1860	79		—
1870	224		183.5%
1880	254		13.4%
1890	213		−16.1%
1900	269		26.3%
1910	136		−49.4%
1920	212		55.9%
1930	202		−4.7%
1940	143		−29.2%
1950	147		2.8%
1960	124		−15.6%
1970	119		−4.0%
1980	169		42.0%
1990	229		35.5%
2000	394		72.1%
2010	596		51.3%
2020	670		12.4%
U.S. Decennial Census

At the 2010 census there were 596 people, 202 households, and 139 families in the town. The population density was 50.1 people per square mile (19.3/km^{2}). There were 243 housing units at an average density of 20.4 per square mile (7.9/km^{2}). The racial makeup of the town was 91.8% White, 2.2% Native American, 0.5% Asian, 0.2% Pacific Islander, and 2.0% from two or more races. Hispanic or Latino of any race were 6.4%.

Of the 202 households 23.8% had children under the age of 18 living with them, 57.9% were married couples living together, 6.9% had a female householder with no husband present, and 31.2% were non-families. 22.3% of households were one person and 9.9% were one person aged 65 or older. The average household size was 2.64 and the average family size was 3.14.

The age distribution was 36.8% under the age of 24, 23.5% from 25 to 44, 26.1% from 45 to 64, and 13.6% 65 or older. The median age was 35.6 years. For every 100 females, there were 116.7 males. For every 100 females age 18 and over, there were 100.4 males.

The median household income was $55,625 and the median family income was $50,250. Males had a median income of $40,167 versus $19,783 for females. The per capita income for the town was $19,408. About 8.0% of families and 7.4% of the population were below the poverty line, including 6.4% of those under age 18 and 8.0% of those age 65 or over.

== Mandatory gun ownership ==
In May 2000, a law was passed which required every homeowner to keep and maintain a firearm. This was highlighted in Michael Moore's 2002 film Bowling for Columbine. Exceptions to this law include "the mentally ill, convicted felons, conscientious objectors and people who cannot afford to own a gun". Previously the city of Kennesaw, Georgia had passed a similar law requiring gun ownership.

== Education ==
Washington County School District is the area school district.
