= Rockville, Utah =

Town in the state of Utah, United States

- Town
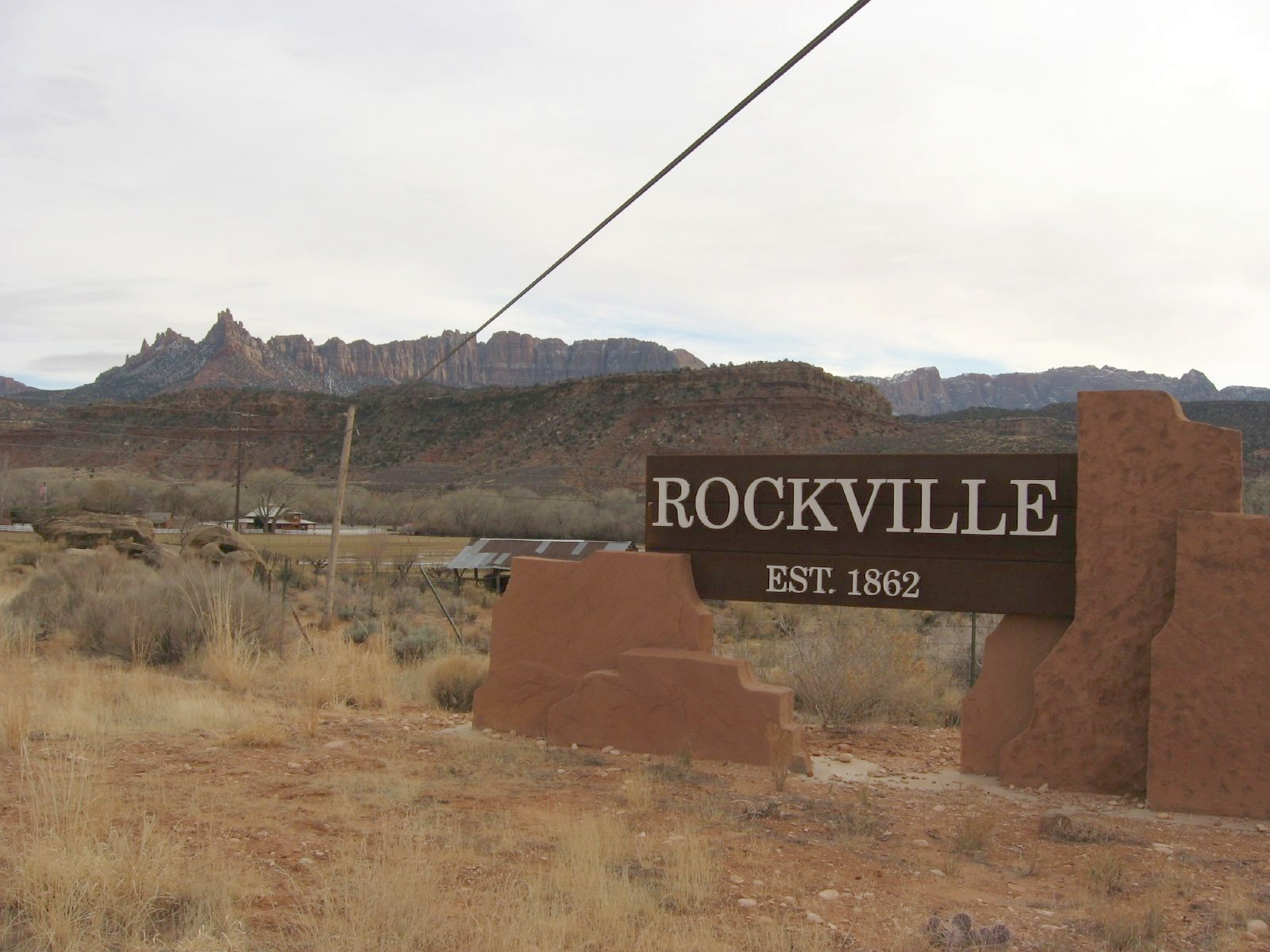

- Location in Washington County and the state of Utah
- Coordinates: 37°08′25″N 113°02′48″W
- Country: United States
- State: Utah
- County: Washington
- Settled: 1860
- Incorporated: June 30, 1987

Area
  - Total: 8.47 sq mi (21.95 km^{2})
  - Land: 8.47 sq mi (21.95 km^{2})
  - Water: 0 sq mi (0.00 km^{2})
- Elevation: 3,927 ft (1,197 m)

Population (2020)
  - Total: 226
  - Density: 31.8/sq mi (12.26/km^{2})
- Time zone: UTC-7 (Mountain (MST))
  - Summer (DST): UTC-6 (MDT)
- ZIP code: 84763
- Area code: 435
- FIPS code: 49-64560
- GNIS feature ID: 2412565
- Website: rockvilleutah.gov

Rockville is a town in Washington County, Utah, United States. It is located along the Virgin River near the mouth of Zion Canyon. The city lies just outside the park boundary for Zion National Park; the park entrance is located approximately 5 miles (8 km) northeast of the town. The population was 226 at the 2020 census.

== Geography ==
According to the United States Census Bureau, the town has a total area of 8.4 square miles (21.8 km^{2}), all land.

=== Climate ===
Rockville experiences warm and dry summers, with summer monthly averages around 75 °F (24 °C), and average highs around 90 °F (32 °C). The town has winter averages around 35 °F (2 °C), and average lows around 23 °F (−5 °C). The town experiences relatively low annual precipitation, with a yearly average of 13.2 inches (340 mm) precipitation. According to the Köppen Climate Classification system, Rockville has a warm-summer Mediterranean climate, abbreviated "Csb" on climate maps.

== Demographics ==
Historical population
| Census | Pop. | Note | %± |
|---|---|---|---|
| 1870 | 225 | | — |
| 1880 | 232 | | 3.1% |
| 1890 | 194 | | −16.4% |
| 1900 | 214 | | 10.3% |
| 1910 | 189 | | −11.7% |
| 1920 | 208 | | 10.1% |
| 1930 | 251 | | 20.7% |
| 1940 | 307 | | 22.3% |
| 1950 | 453 | | 47.6% |
| 1980 | 156 | | — |
| 1990 | 182 | | 16.7% |
| 2000 | 247 | | 35.7% |
| 2010 | 245 | | −0.8% |
| 2020 | 226 | | −7.8% |
U.S. Decennial Census

As of the census of 2010, there were 245 people, 119 households, and 63 families residing in the town. The population density was 29.3 people per square mile (11.3/km^{2}). There were 142 housing units at an average density of 16.9 per square mile (6.5/km^{2}). The racial makeup of the town was 96.76% White, 0.40% Asian, 1.21% from other races, and 1.62% from two or more races. Hispanic or Latino of any race were 6.88% of the population.

There were 119 households, out of which 21.7% had children under the age of 18 living with them, 46.1% were married couples living together, 7.8% had a female householder with no husband present, and 44.3% were non-families. 39.1% of all households were made up of individuals, and 12.2% had someone living alone who was 65 years of age or older. The average household size was 2.15 and the average family size was 2.88.

In the town, the population was spread out, with 15.9% under the age of 18, 6.1% from 18 to 24, 24.9% from 25 to 44, 39.6% from 45 to 64, and 19.2% who were 65 years of age or older. The median age was 52 years. For every 100 females, there were 90.0 males. For every 100 females aged 18 and over, there were 91.1 males.

The median income for a household in the town was $37,917, and the median income for a family was $39,375. Males had a median income of $30,417 versus $27,917 for females. The per capita income for the town was $19,396. About 10.1% of families and 10.4% of the population were below the poverty line, including 18.2% of those under the age of eighteen and 7.4% of those 65 or over.

== Points of interest ==
- Zion National Park
- The town is the site of a historic steel truss bridge which spans the Virgin River. The bridge was built in 1924 and is one of the last surviving examples of a rigid Parker through truss bridge in the state of Utah.
- Grafton, Utah, a popular historic ghost town from the 19th century.

== See also ==
- List of cities and towns in Utah
