= Eagle Crags =

Mountain in the American state of Utah

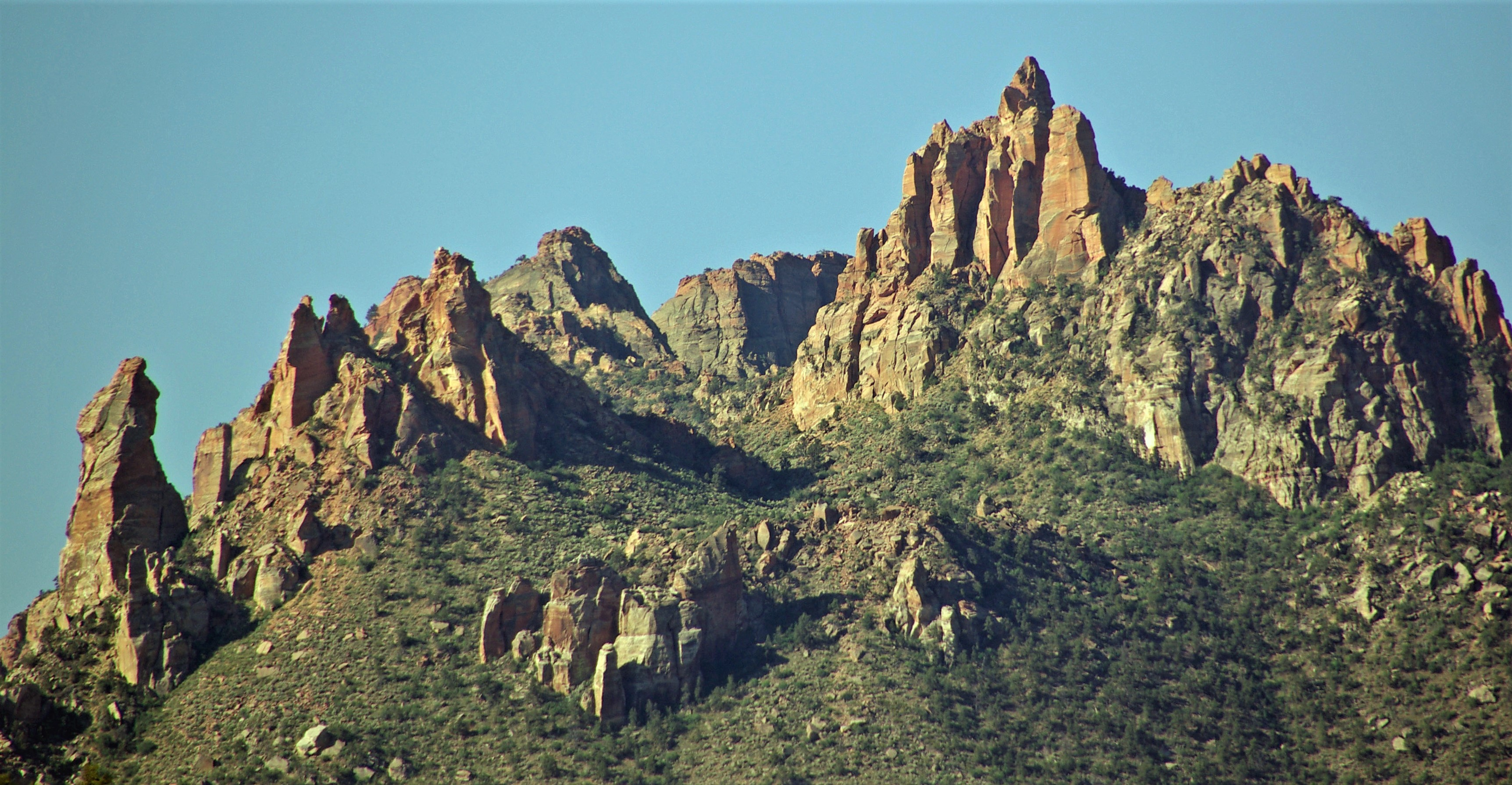
- Eagle Crags, northwest aspect

Highest point
- Elevation: 6,380 ft (1,940 m)
- Prominence: 400 ft (120 m)
- Parent peak: Lower Mountain (6,780 ft)
- Isolation: 1.80 mi (2.90 km)
- Coordinates: 37°07′40″N 113°00′44″W

Geography
- Location within Utah Location within the United States
- Country: United States
- State: Utah
- County: Washington
- Protected area: Canaan Mountain Wilderness
- Parent range: Colorado Plateau
- Topo map: USGS Springdale West

Geology
- Rock age: Jurassic
- Rock type: Navajo sandstone

Eagle Crags is a 6,380-foot (1,940 m) elevation summit located in the Canaan Mountain Wilderness of Washington County in southwest Utah, United States.

== Description ==
Eagle Crags is situated 2.5 mi (4.0 km) southeast of Rockville and 2.5 miles south of Zion National Park, and can be seen from Utah State Route 9. Topographic relief is significant as it rises 2,800-foot (850-meter) in two miles on its north side above the Virgin River which drains precipitation runoff from this mountain. Its nearest higher neighbor is Lower Mountain, 2 mi (3.2 km) to the south, Shunesburg Mountain is four miles to the northeast, and Smithsonian Butte is four miles to the west-southwest. The uppermost part of this mountain is composed of light-colored Jurassic Navajo Sandstone which overlays the deep-red sandstone of the Kayenta Formation. Access is via the 2.8 mile Eagle Crags Trail which passes through pinyon–juniper woodland, sagebrush, blackbrush, yucca, and cacti as it gains 900 feet of elevation to the base of the sandstone pinnacles, spires, and crags. Views from the trail include Mount Kinesava, Johnson Mountain, and other landmarks within Zion National Park. This geographical feature's name was officially adopted in 1934 by the U.S. Board on Geographic Names.

== Gallery ==
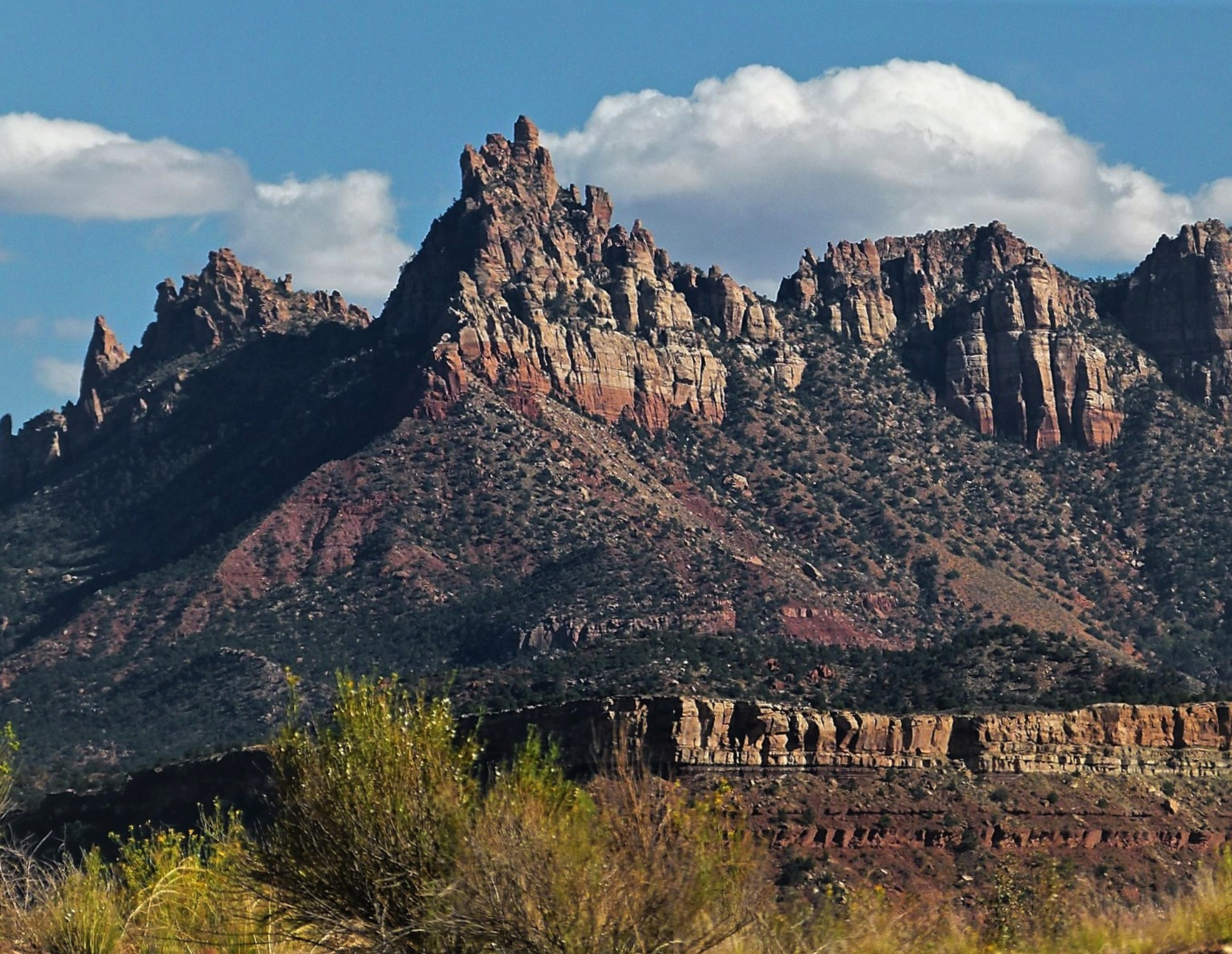

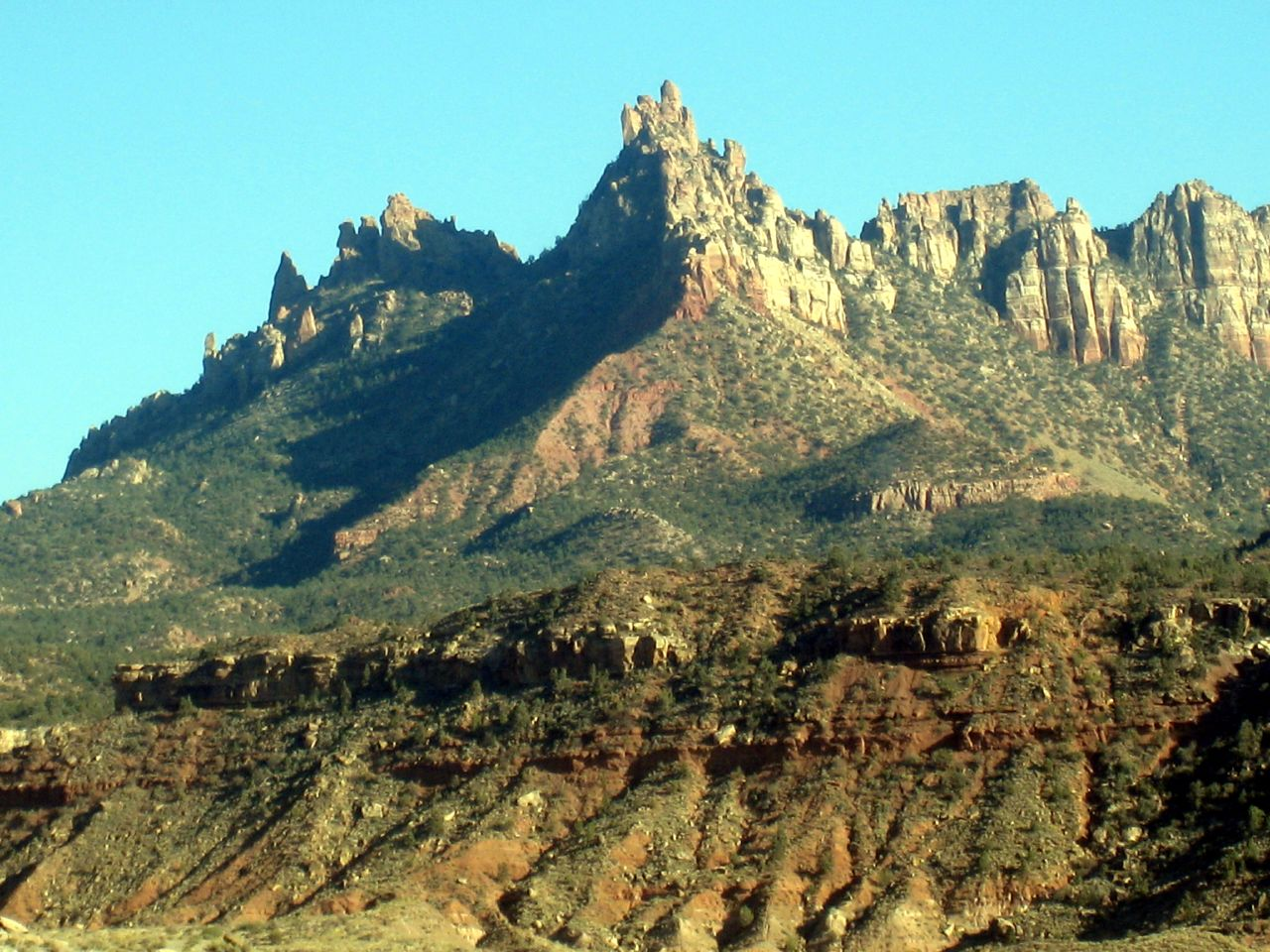

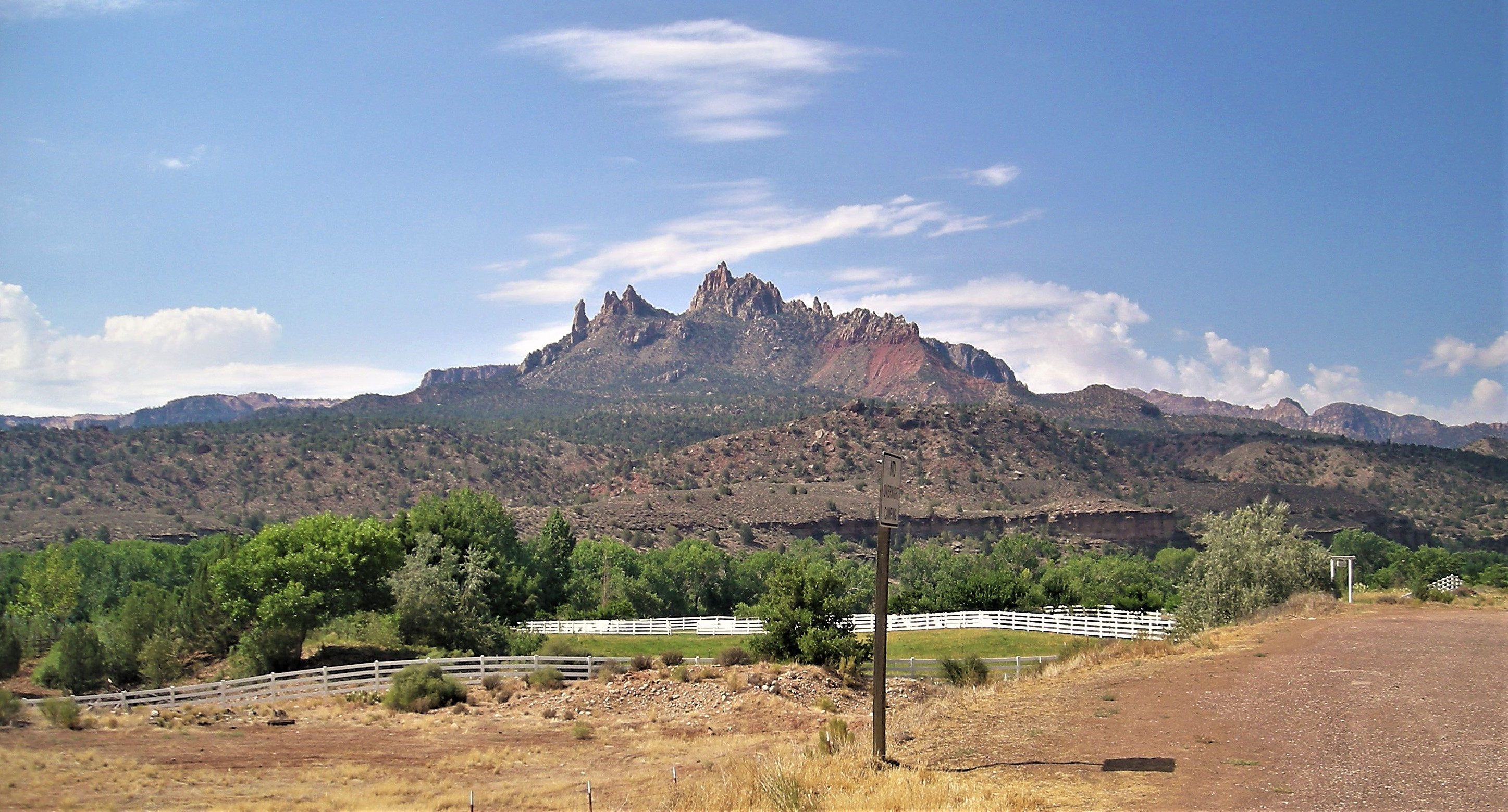
North aspect

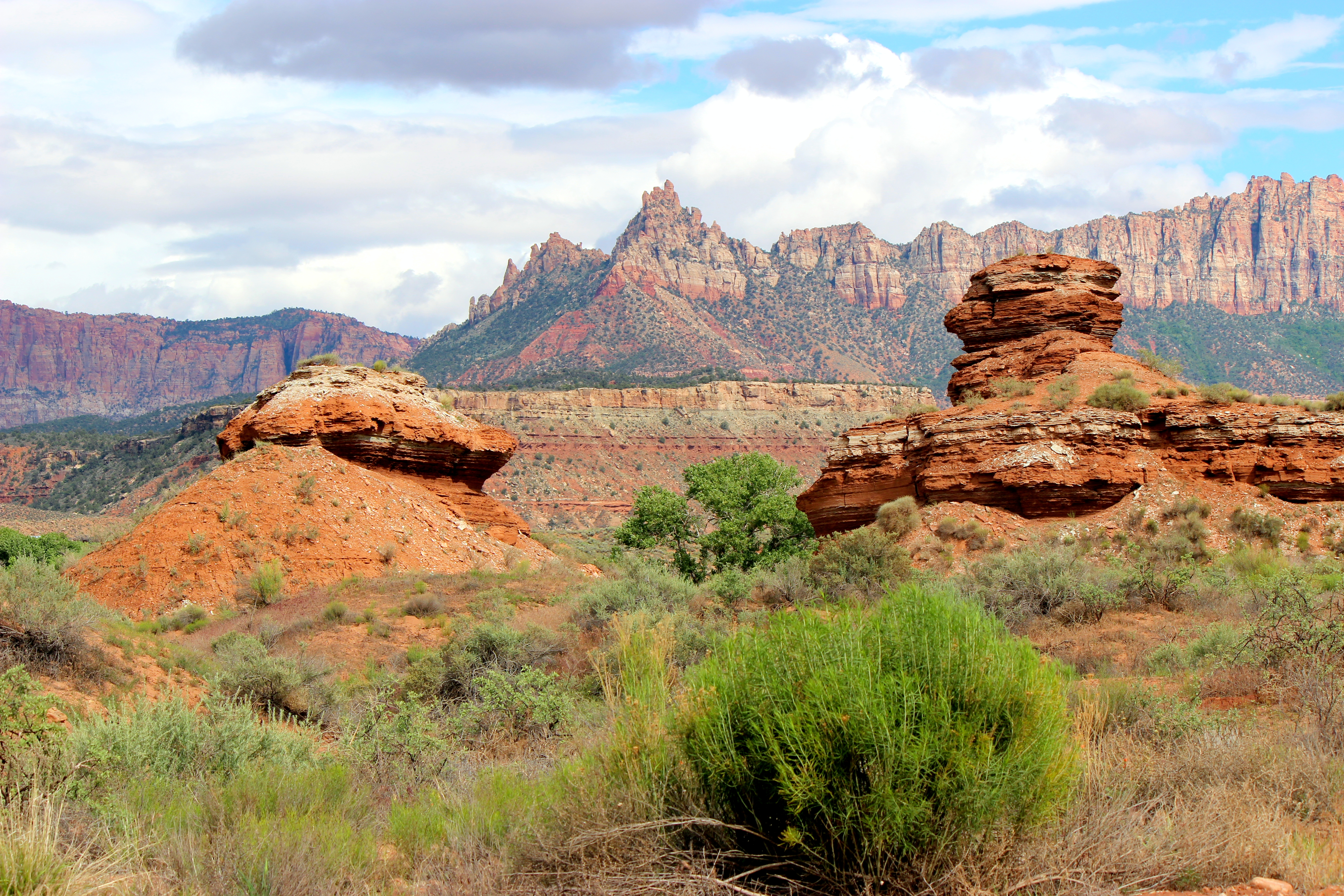

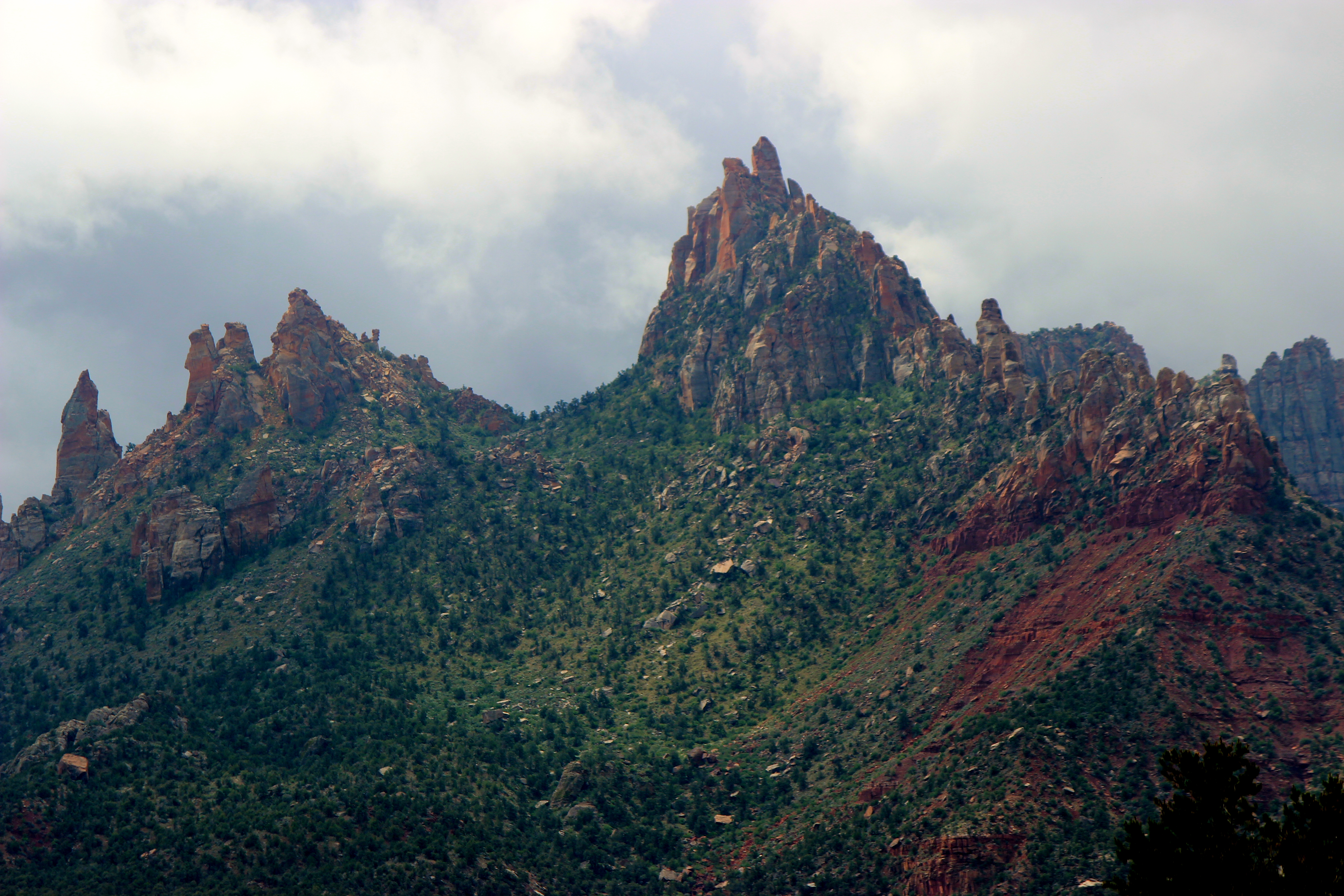

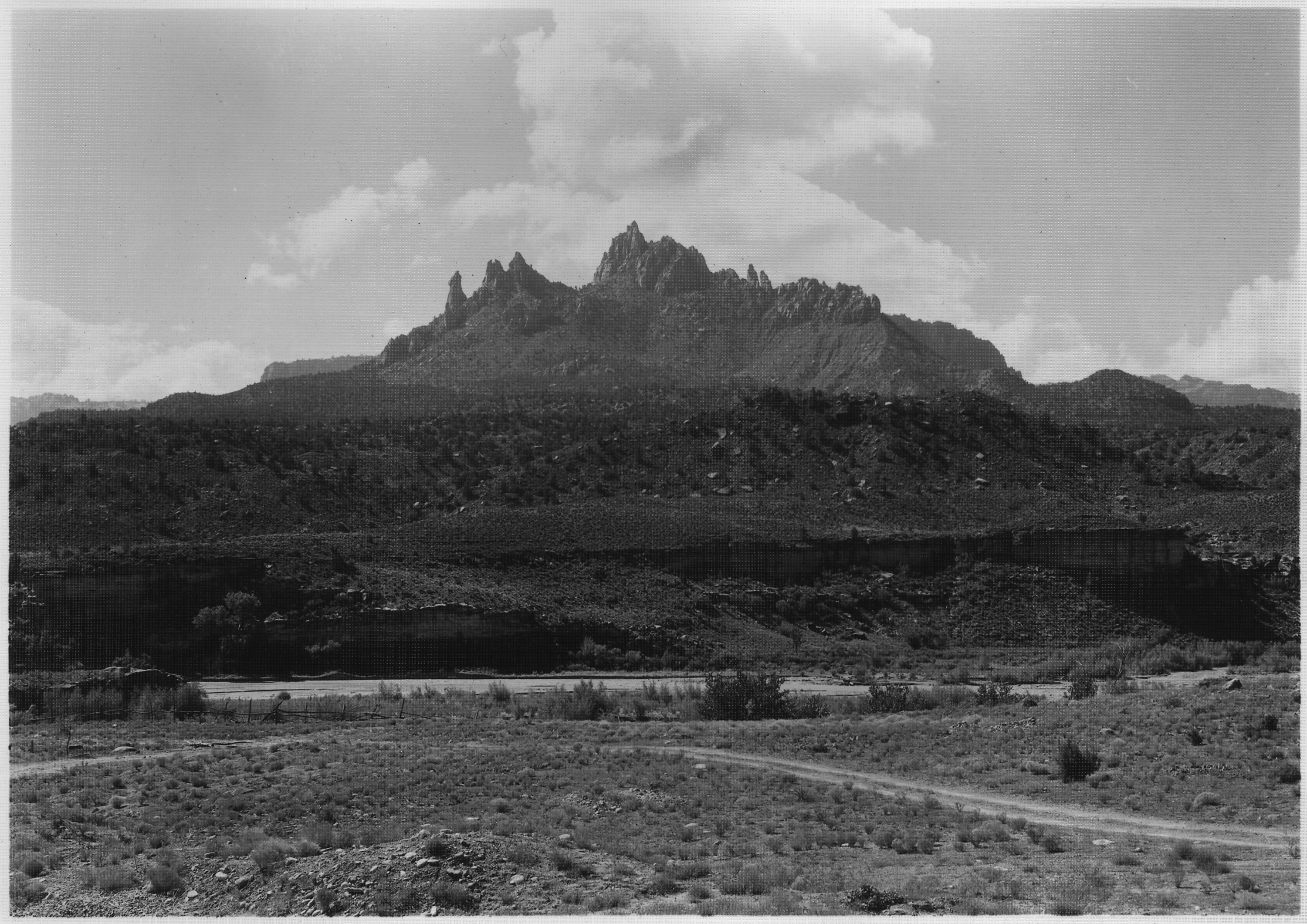
Eagle Crags in 1929

== Climate ==
Spring and fall are the most favorable seasons to visit Eagle Crags. According to the Köppen climate classification system, it is located in a Cold semi-arid climate zone, which is defined by the coldest month having an average mean temperature below 32 °F (0 °C), and at least 50% of the total annual precipitation being received during the spring and summer. This desert climate receives less than 10 inches (250 millimeters) of annual rainfall, and snowfall is generally light during the winter.

== See also ==
- Geology of the Zion and Kolob canyons area
- Colorado Plateau
