= Johnson Mountain (Utah) =

Mountain in the state of Utah

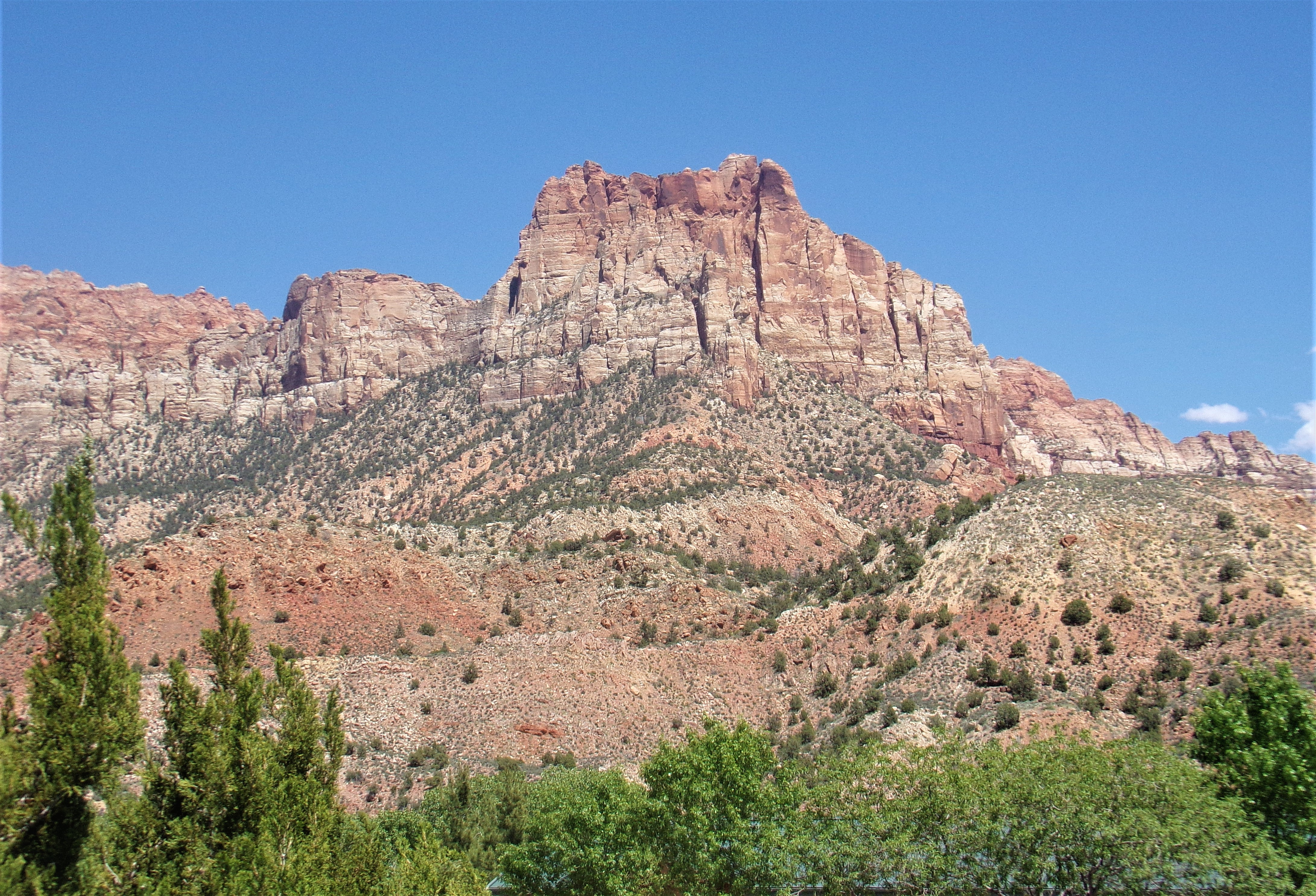
- Johnson Mountain, southwest aspect

Highest point
- Elevation: 6,106 ft (1,861 m)
- Prominence: 586 ft (179 m)
- Parent peak: The Watchman (6,545 ft)
- Isolation: 0.85 mi (1.37 km)
- Coordinates: 37°10′27″N 112°59′10″W

Geography
- Location within Utah Location within the United States
- Country: United States
- State: Utah
- County: Washington
- Protected area: Zion National Park
- Parent range: Colorado Plateau
- Topo map: USGS Springdale East

Geology
- Rock age: Jurassic
- Rock type: Navajo sandstone

Climbing
- Easiest route: class 4 scrambling

Johnson Mountain is a 6,106-foot (1,861 m) Navajo Sandstone summit located in Zion National Park, in Washington County of southwest Utah, United States.

== Description ==
Johnson Mountain is located immediately southeast of Springdale, towering 2,200 feet (670 meters) above the town and the floor of Zion Canyon. It is wedged between the North and East Forks of the Virgin River which drain precipitation runoff from this mountain. Its nearest higher neighbor is The Watchman, 0.8 mi (1.3 km) to the north-northeast, and Mount Kinesava is positioned 2.94 mi (4.73 km) directly across the canyon to the northwest. Shunesburg Mountain is set 2 mi (3.2 km) to the southeast, directly across the mouth of Parunuweap Canyon. This feature's name was officially adopted in 1934 by the U.S. Board on Geographic Names. It is named for Nephi Johnson (1833–1919), a Mormon missionary, interpreter, explorer, and the first white man to visit Zion Canyon. In 1858 a Paiute guide by the name of Nauguts led Nephi into the Zion Canyon area of the upper Virgin River. Johnson wrote a favorable report about the agricultural potential of the upper Virgin River basin, where he founded the town of Virgin.

== Climate ==
Spring and fall are the most favorable seasons to visit Johnson Mountain. According to the Köppen climate classification system, it is located in a Cold semi-arid climate zone, which is defined by the coldest month having an average mean temperature below 32 °F (0 °C), and at least 50% of the total annual precipitation being received during the spring and summer. This desert climate receives less than 10 inches (250 millimeters) of annual rainfall, and snowfall is generally light during the winter.

== Gallery ==
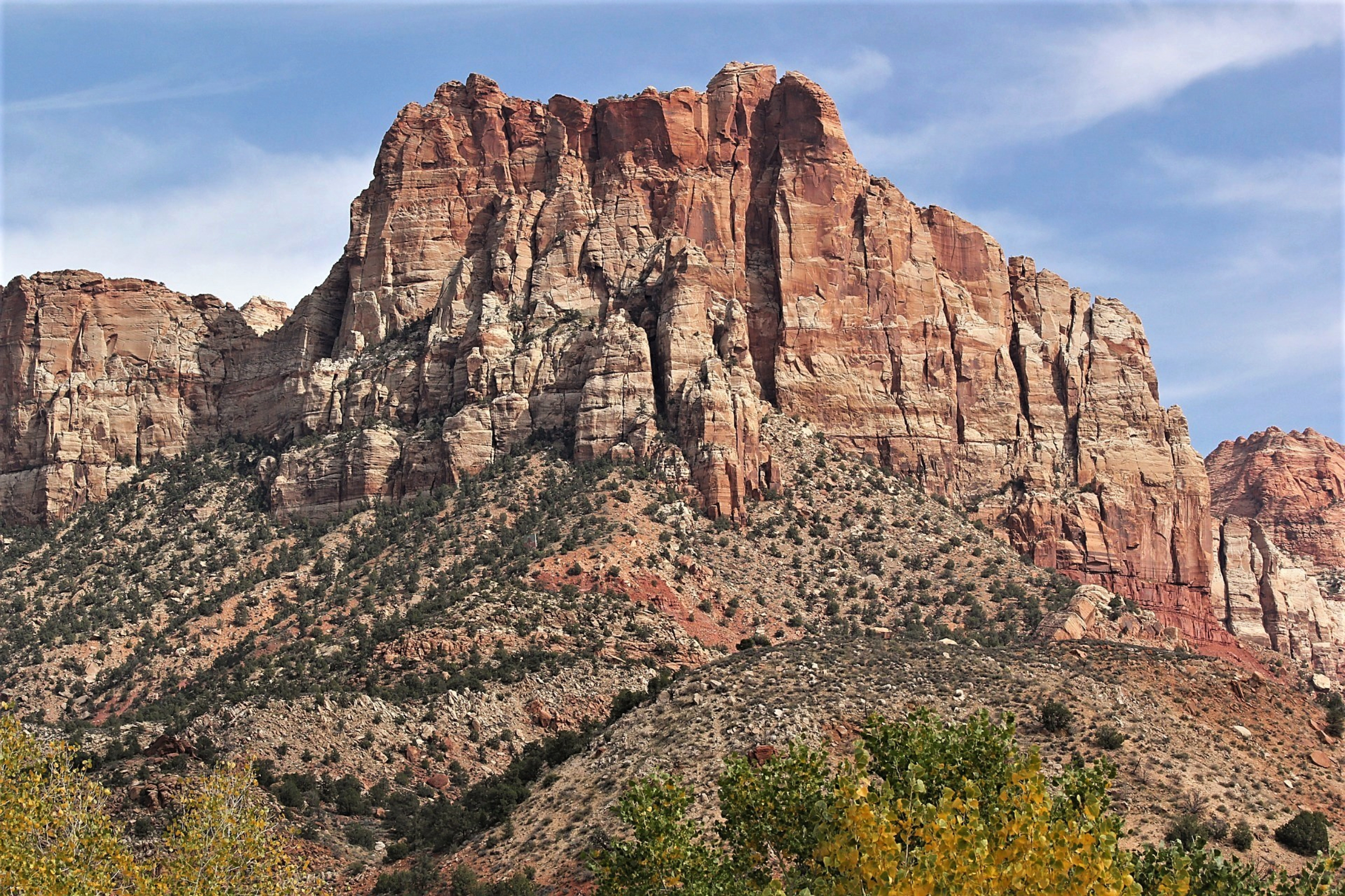

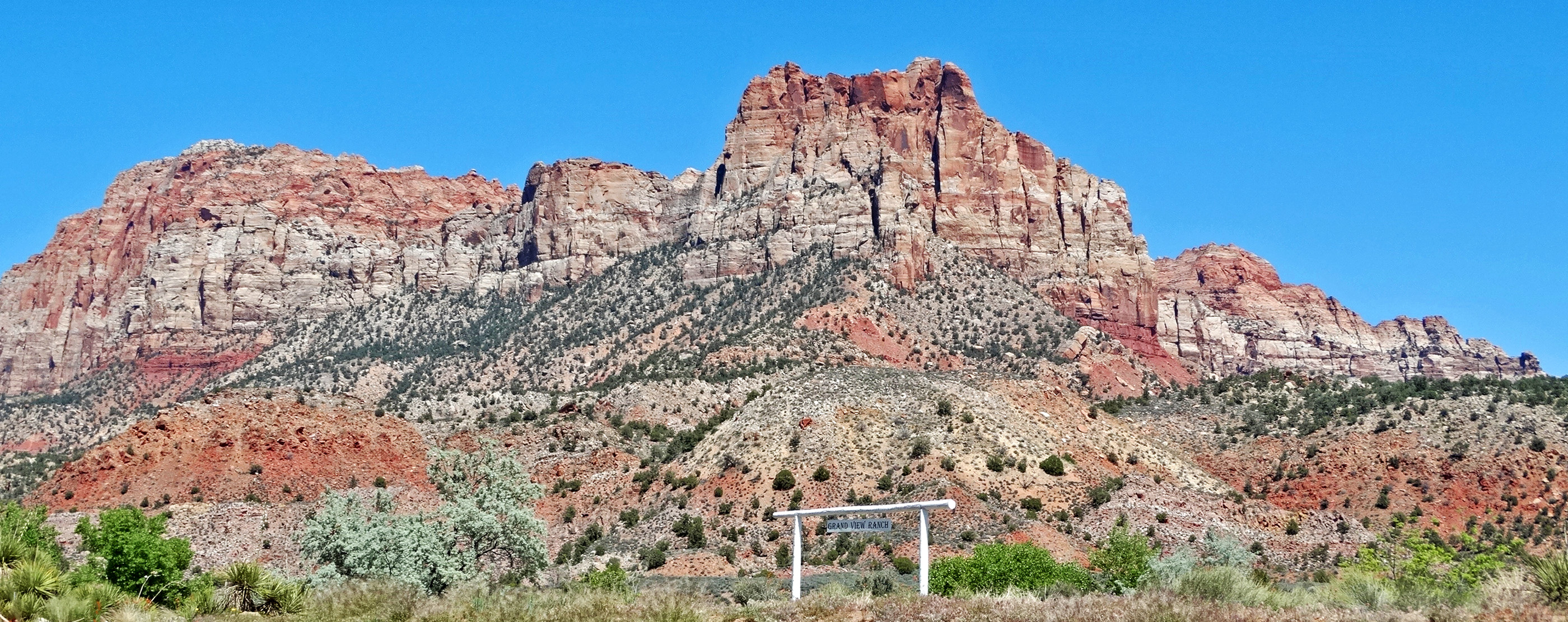

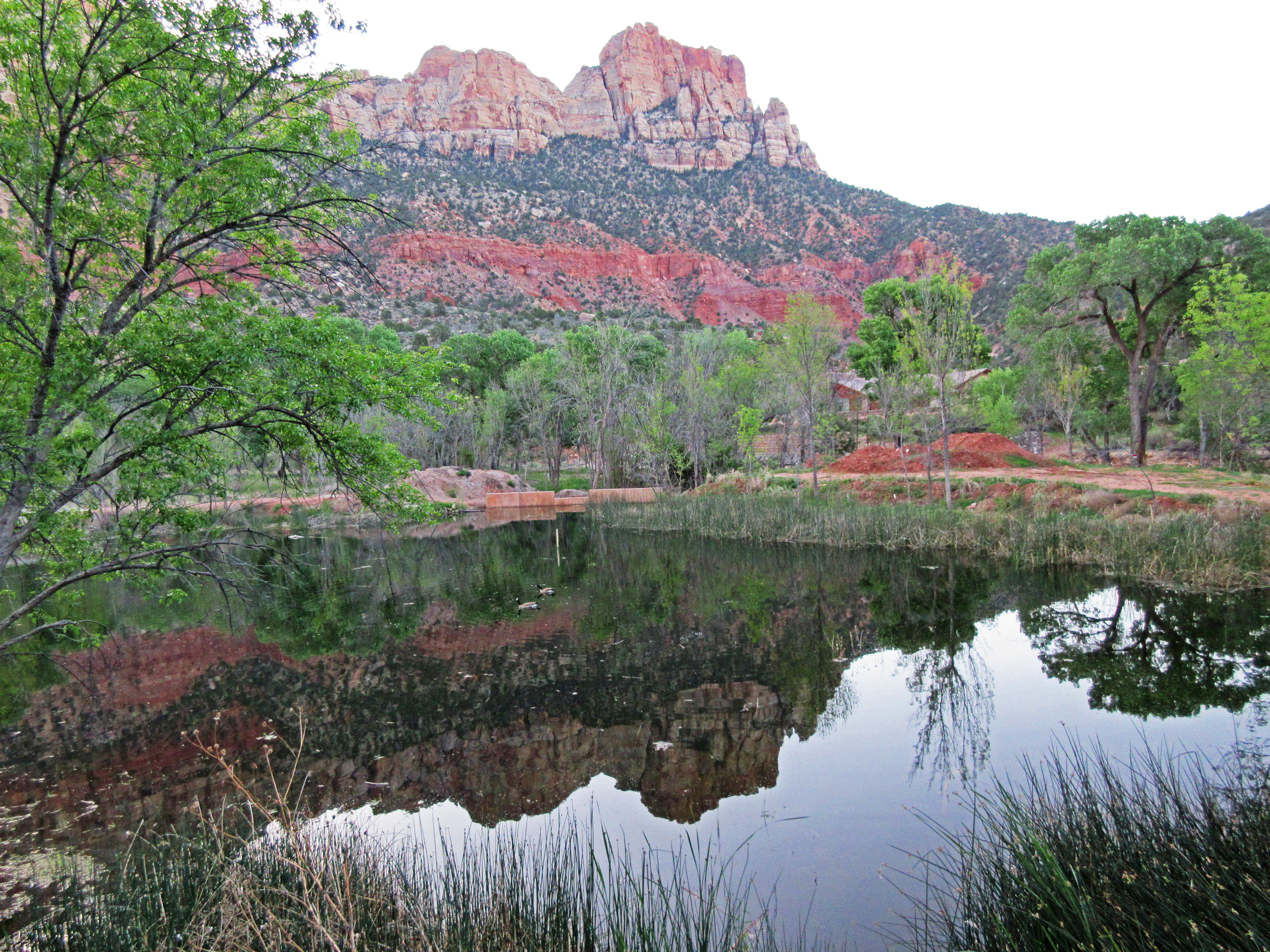

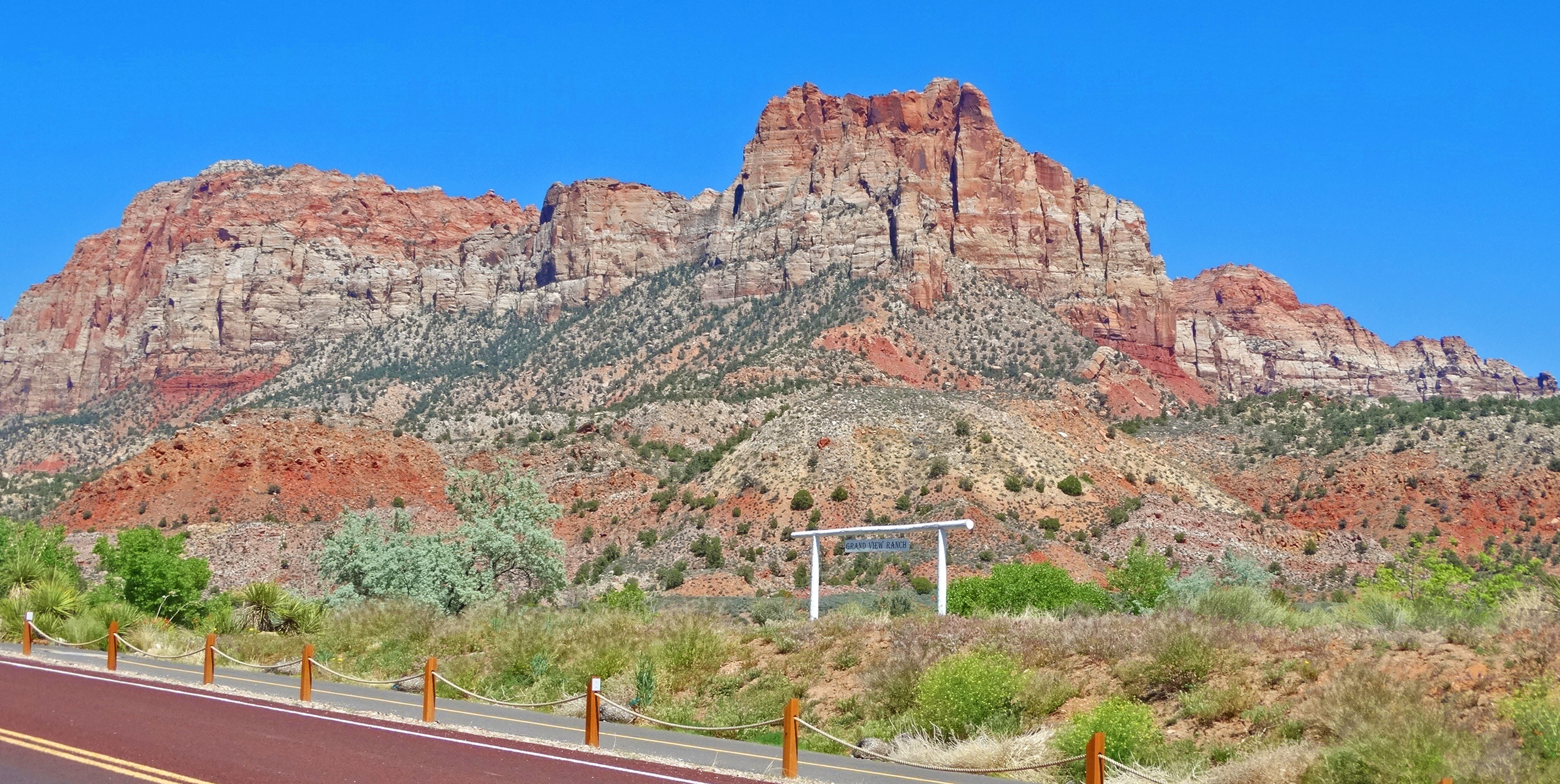

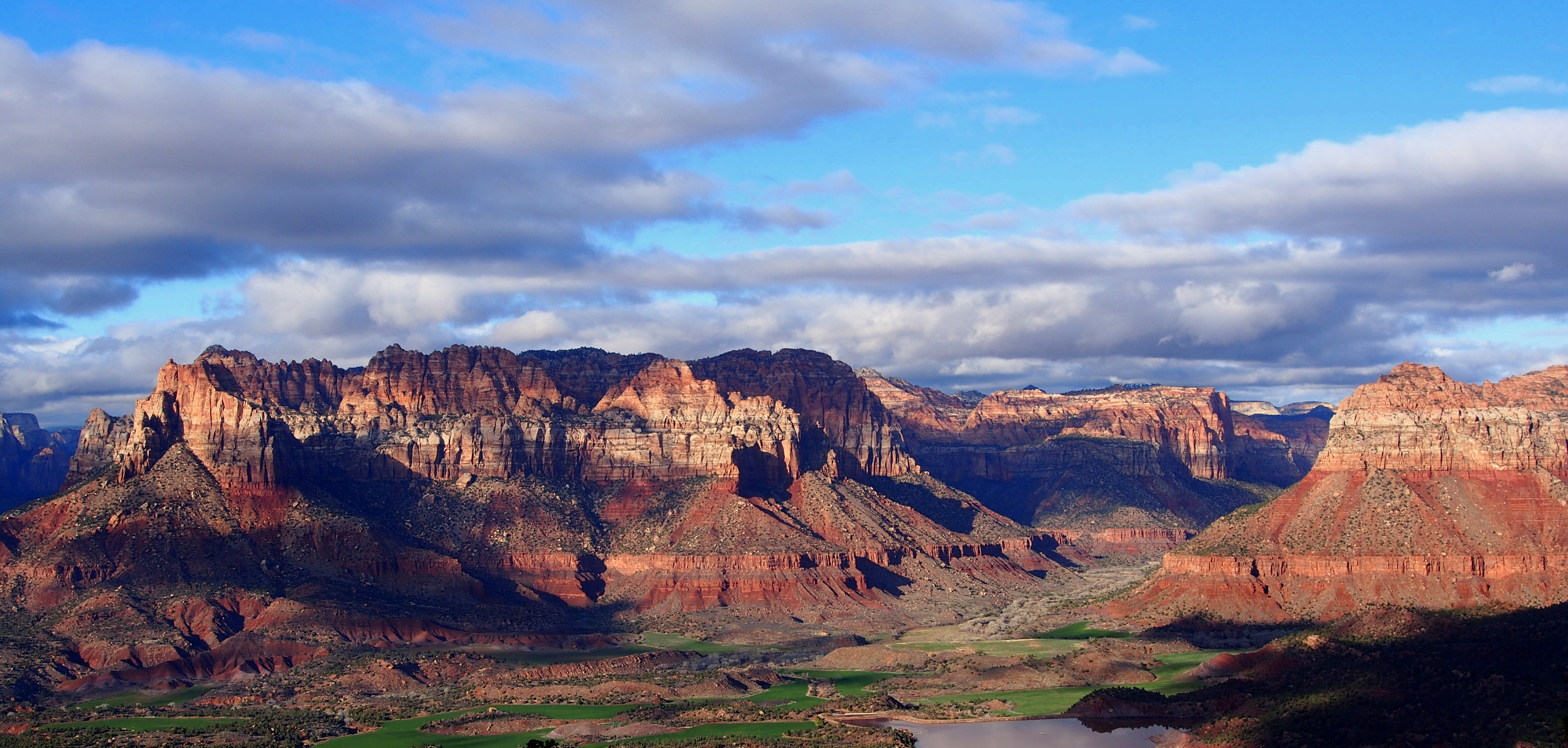
Parunaweep Canyon and Johnson Mountain (left edge) seen from Eagle Crags

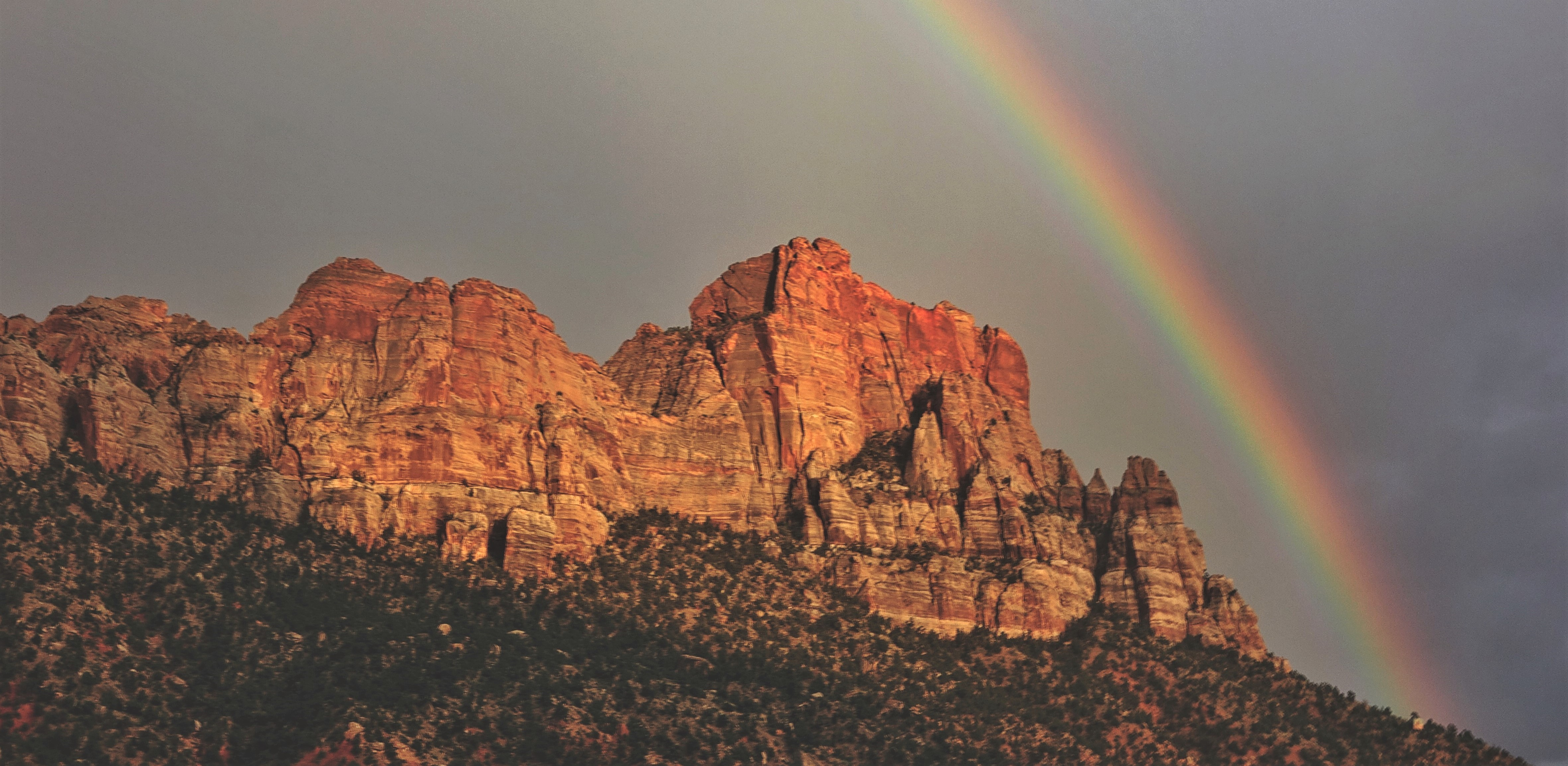
West aspect

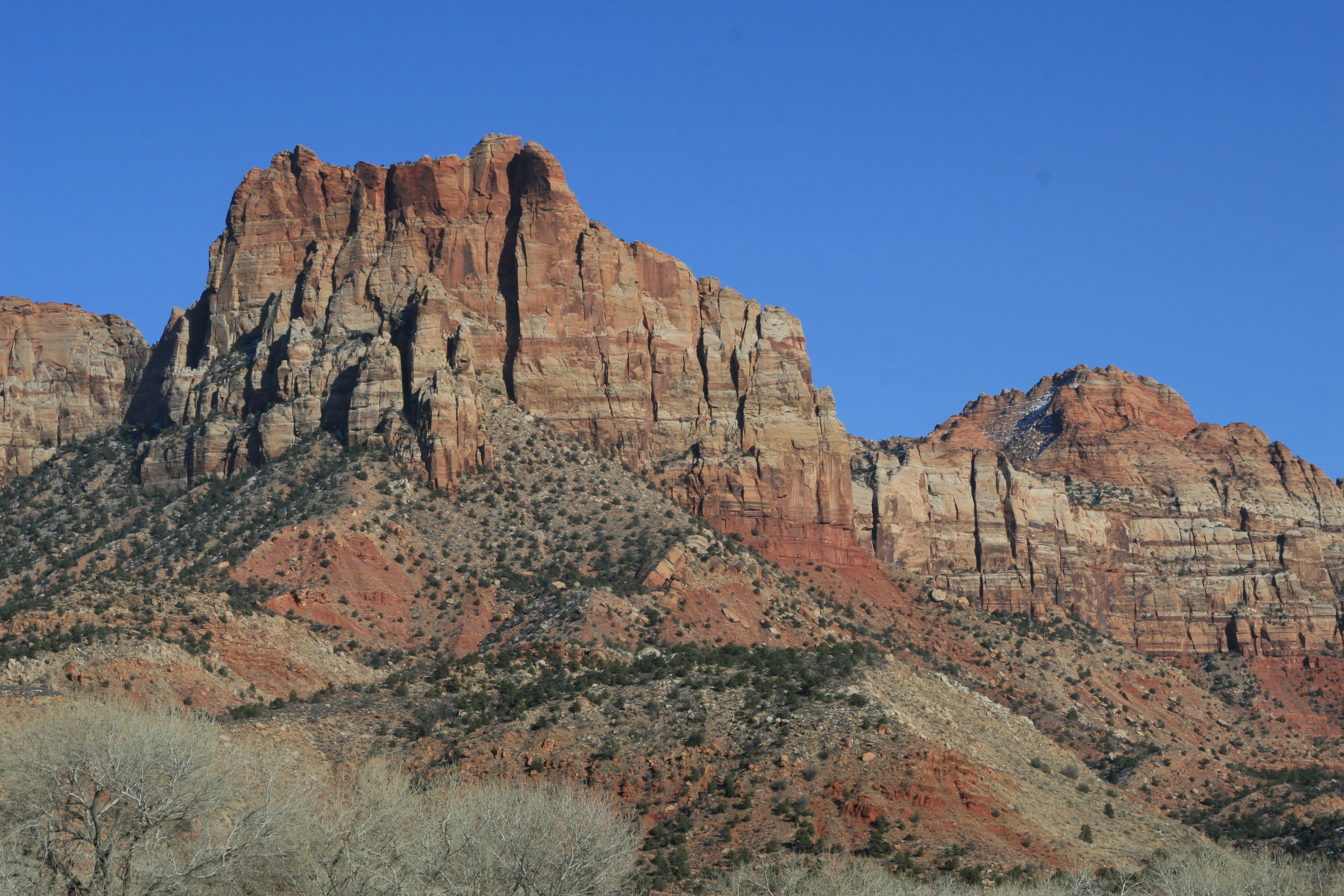

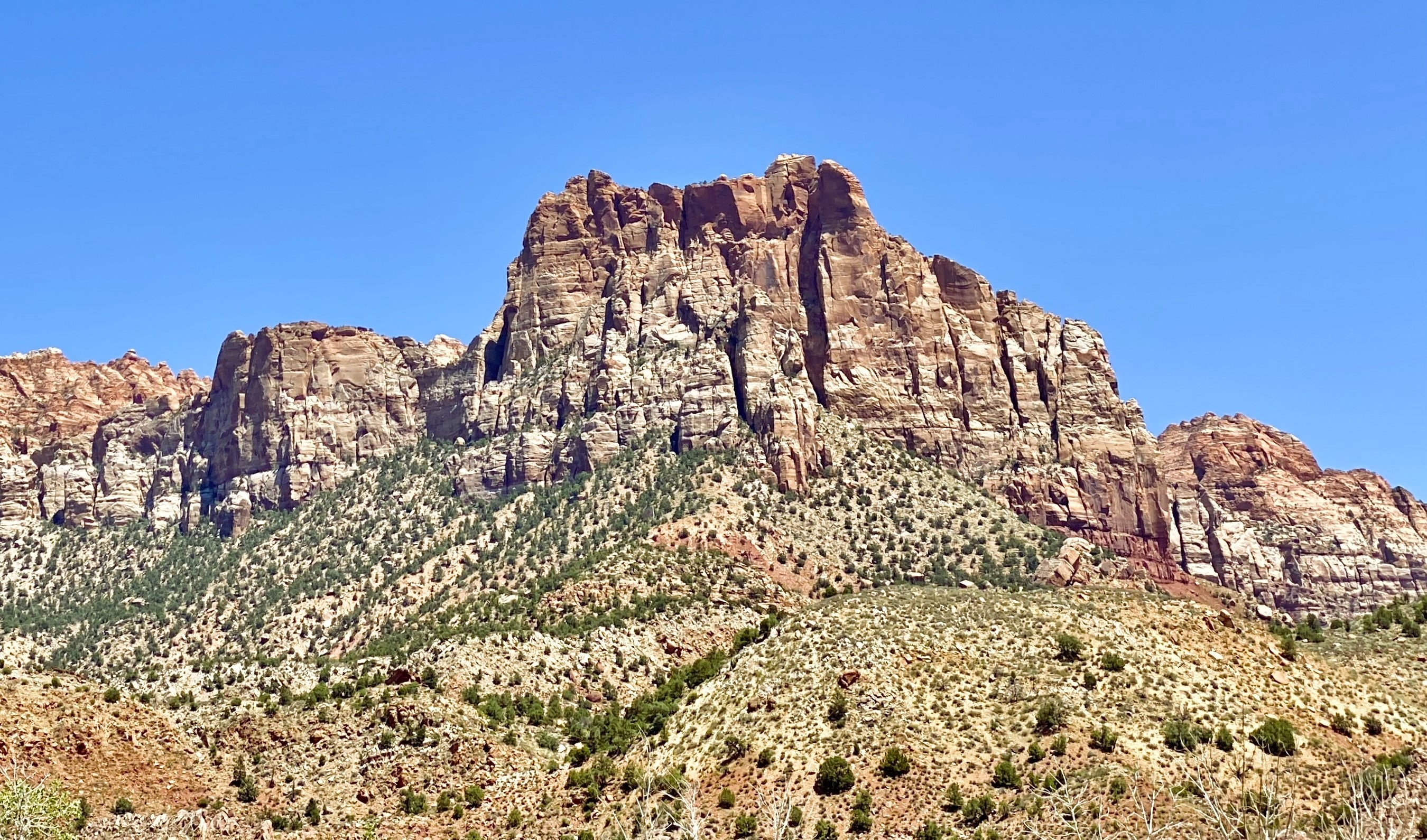

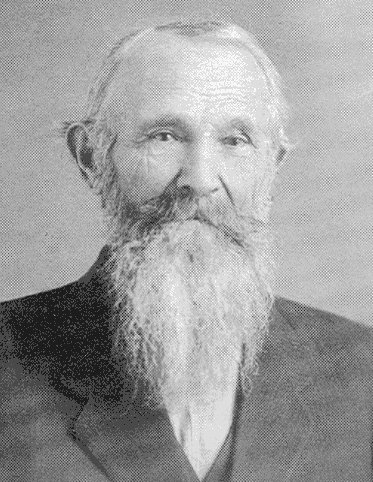
Nephi Johnson

== See also ==
- Geology of the Zion and Kolob canyons area
- Colorado Plateau
