= De Mille Peak =

Mountain in Utah, United States of America

Coordinates: 37°07′35″N 112°58′03″W

De Mille Peak is a summit in Washington County, Utah, in the United States with an elevation of 6,539 feet (1,993 m). It is in the Canaan Mountain Wilderness and near the southern boundary of Zion National Park.

De Mille Peak was named in honor of Bishop Oliver De Mille, a Mormon pioneer.
