= Smithsonian Butte =

Mountain in the American state of Utah

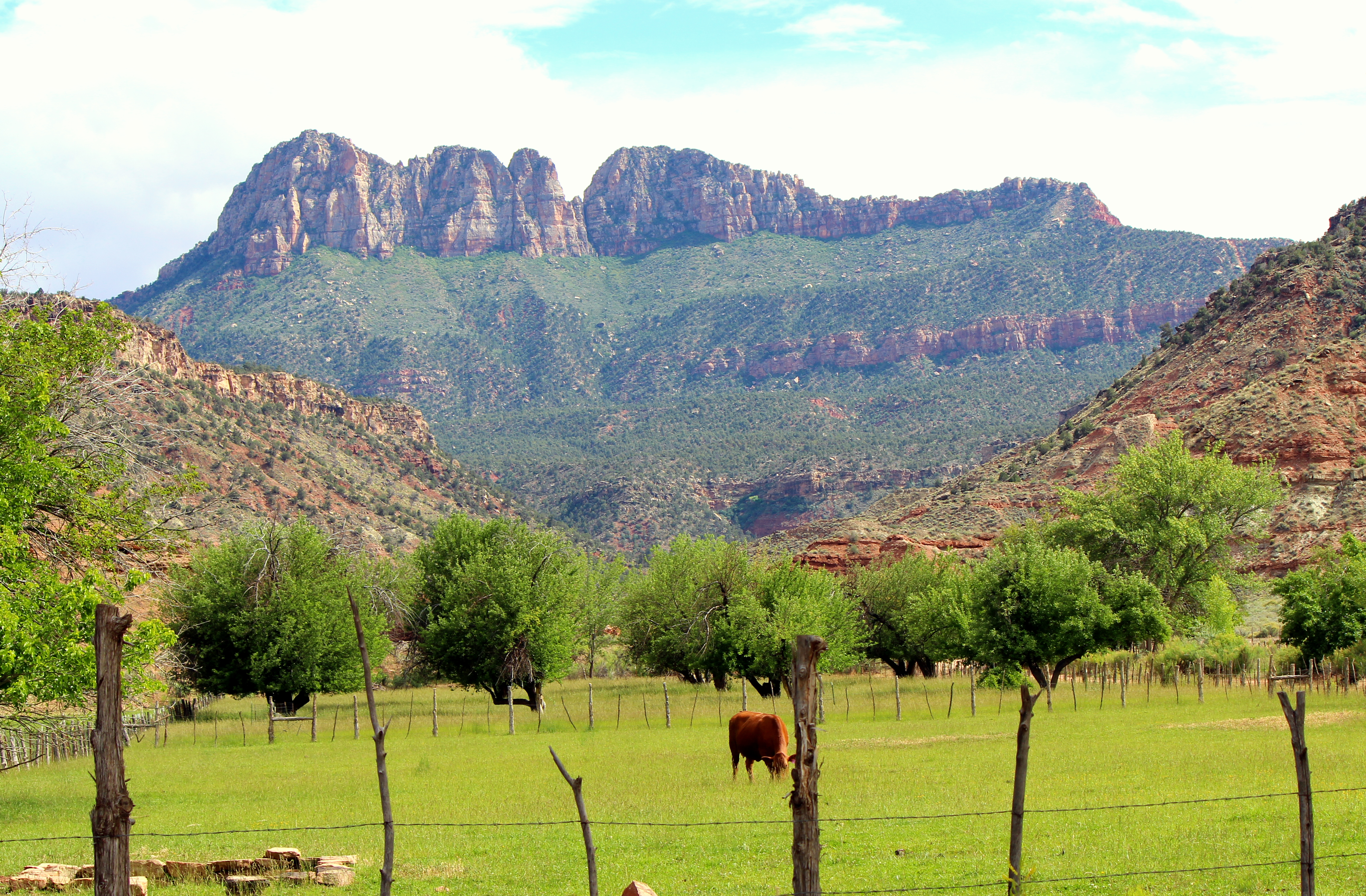
- Smithsonian Butte, north aspect

Highest point
- Elevation: 6,780 ft (2,070 m)
- Prominence: 1,400 ft (430 m)
- Parent peak: Canaan Mountain (7,363 ft)
- Isolation: 3.21 mi (5.17 km)
- Coordinates: 37°06′50″N 113°04′47″W

Geography
- Location within Utah Location within the United States
- Country: United States
- State: Utah
- County: Washington
- Protected area: Canaan Mountain Wilderness
- Parent range: Colorado Plateau
- Topo map: USGS Smithsonian Butte

Geology
- Rock age: Jurassic
- Rock type: Navajo sandstone

Climbing
- Easiest route: class 5.3 climbing

Smithsonian Butte is a 6,780-foot (2,070 m) elevation summit located in the Canaan Mountain Wilderness of Washington County in southwest Utah, United States.

== Description ==
Smithsonian Butte is situated four miles (6.4 km) southwest of Rockville and four miles south of Zion National Park, and can be seen from Utah State Route 9. Topographic relief is significant as it rises 2,000-feet (610-meters) in one mile on its south side, and 3,000 feet in three miles above the Virgin River on its north aspect which drains precipitation runoff from this mountain. Its nearest higher neighbor is Zion Butte, 3.2 mi (5.1 km) to the southeast, and Eagle Crags are four miles to the east-northeast. The uppermost part of this mountain is composed of light-colored Jurassic Navajo Sandstone which overlays the deep-red sandstone of the Kayenta Formation. This geographical feature was named by geologist Clarence Edward Dutton (1841–1912) for the Smithsonian Institution which had sponsored an exploration of the region, and the toponym was officially adopted in 1934 by the U.S. Board on Geographic Names. From 1875 to 1877, Dutton's field party mapped 12,000 square miles (31,000 km^{2}) of the high plateaus of southern Utah. The saddle between Smithsonian Butte and its parent Caanan Mountain is named Dutton Pass, after him. Access to this mountain is via the Smithsonian Butte National Back Country Byway.

== Gallery ==
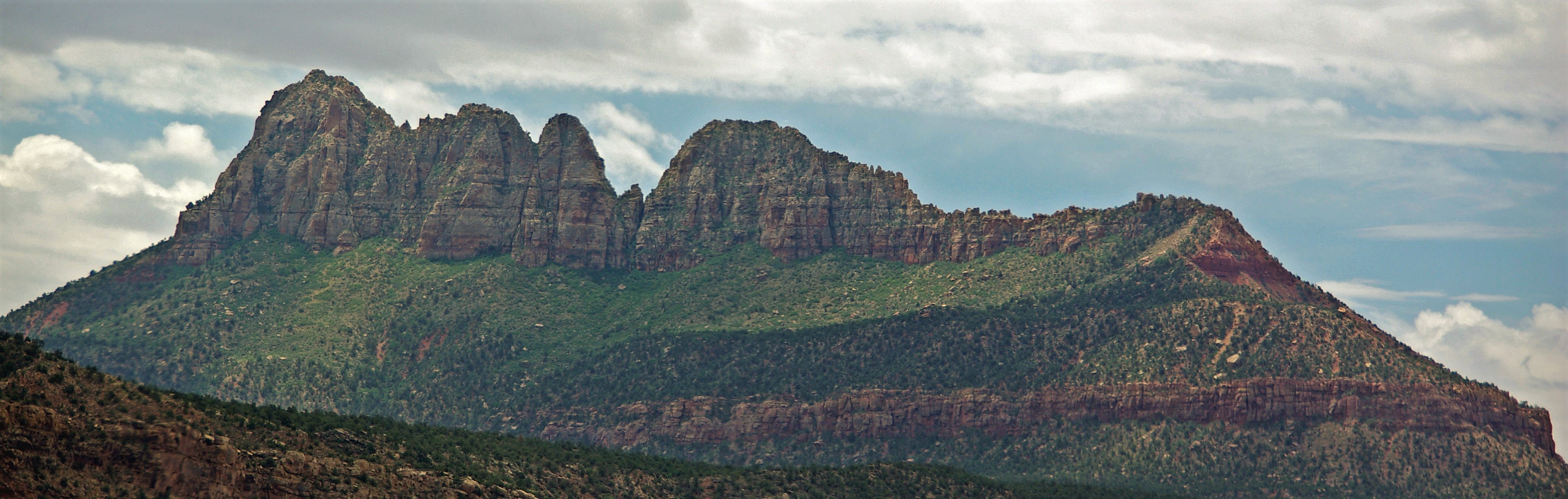

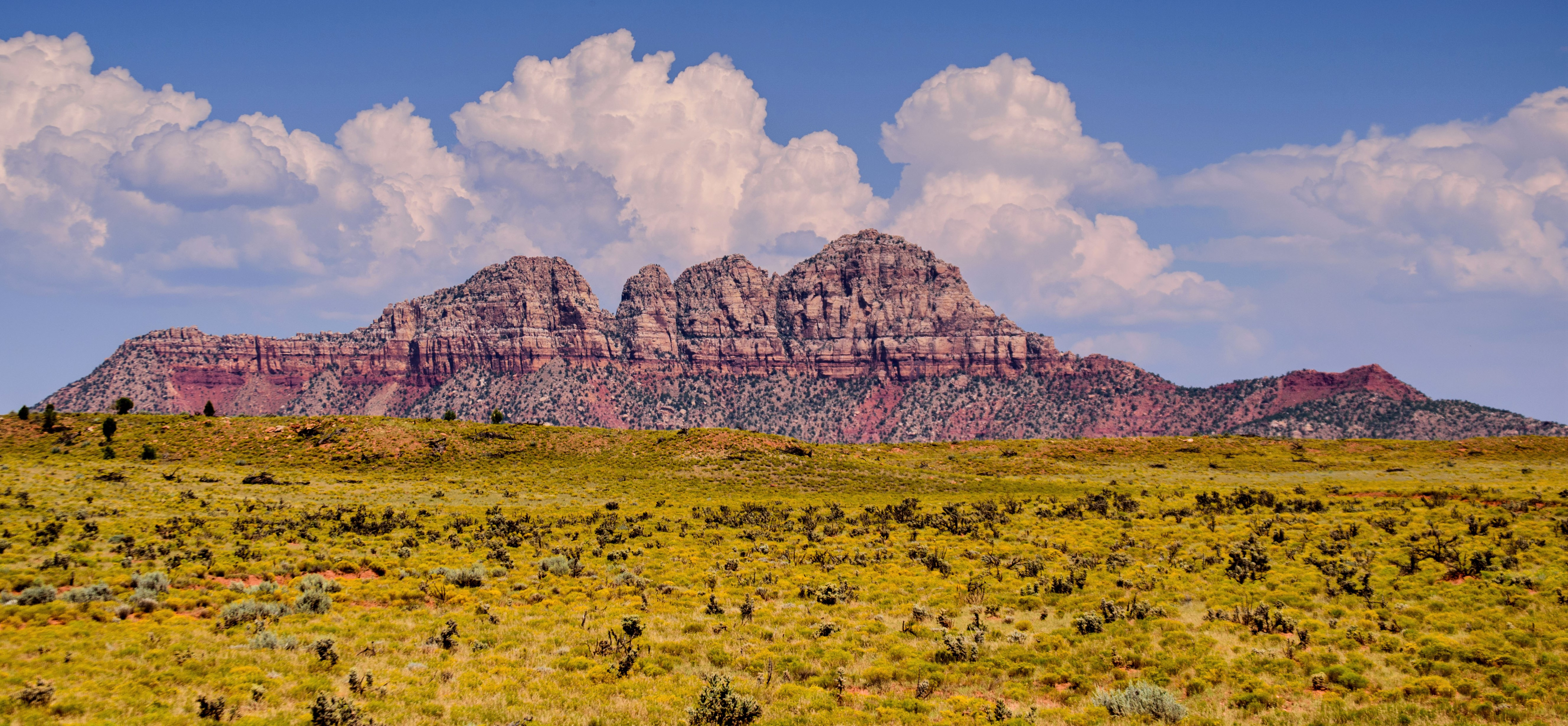
South aspect

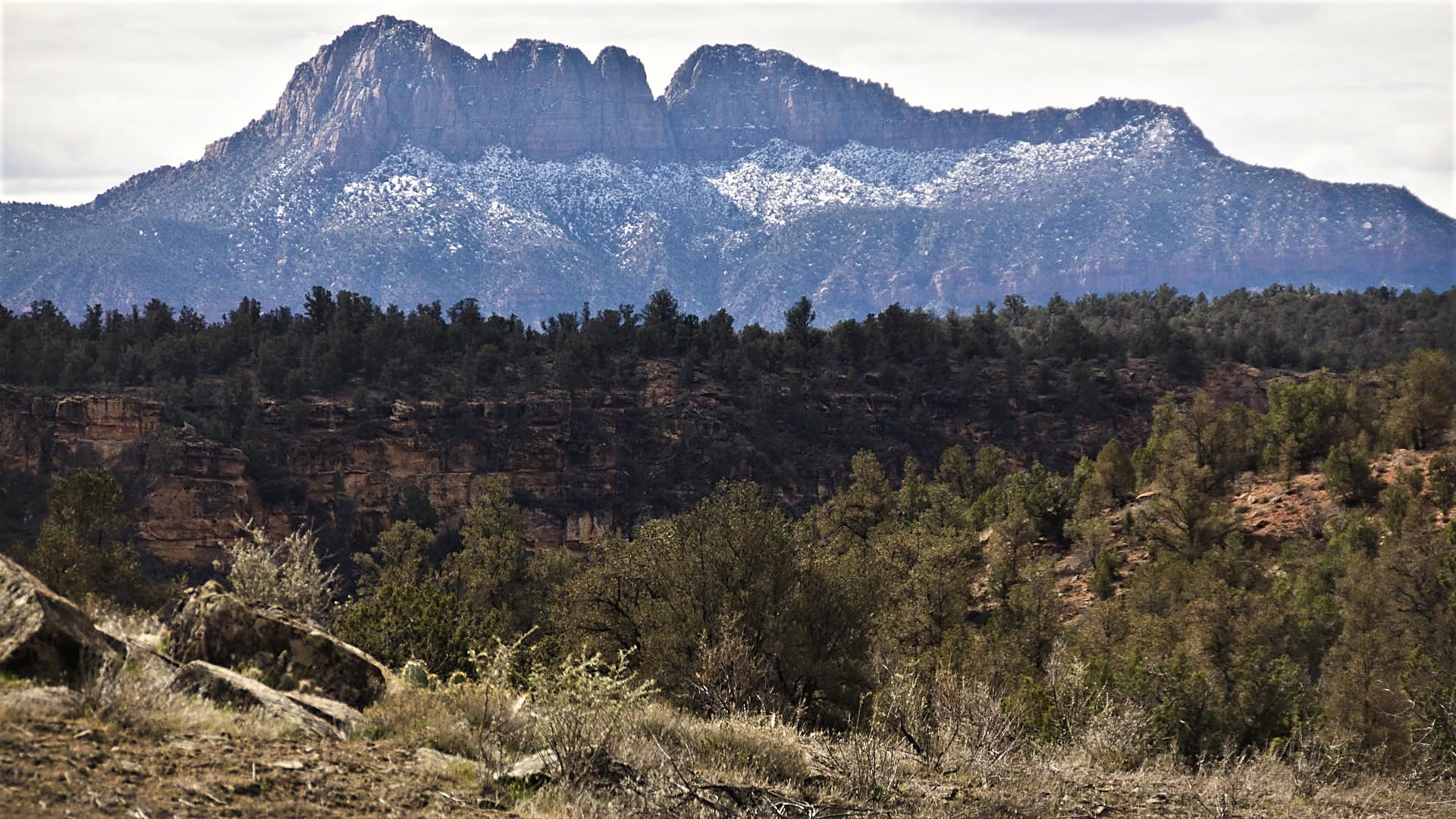

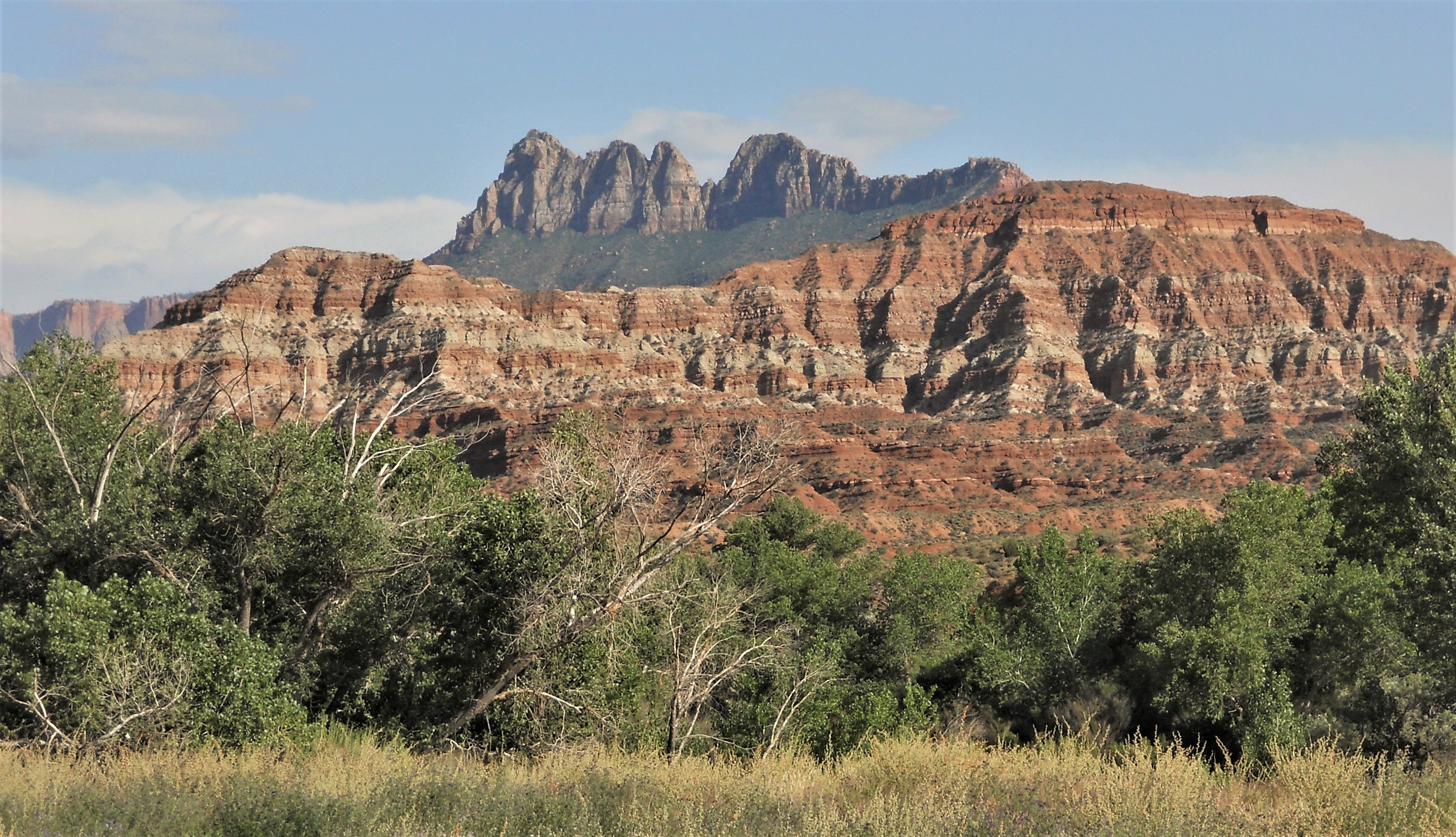

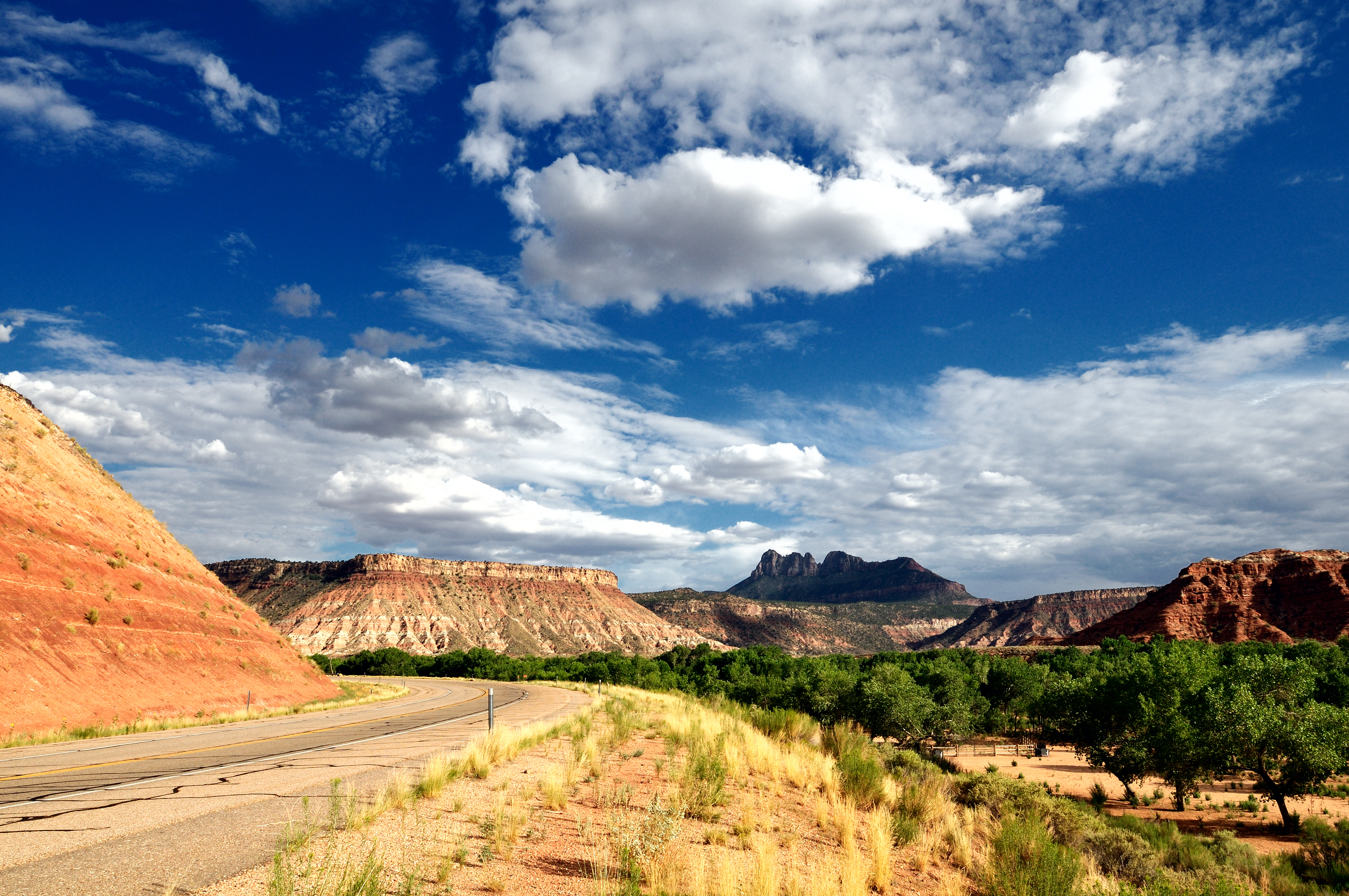

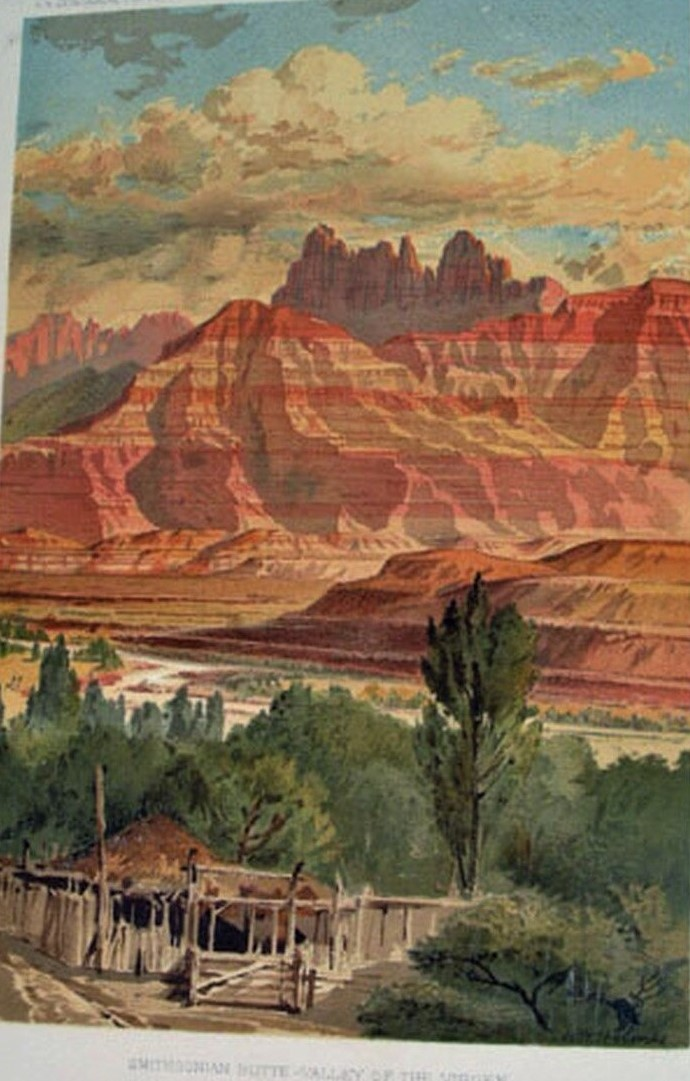
Smithsonian Butte depicted in a colored frontispiece chromolith by William Henry Holmes, published in "Tertiary History of the Grand Canon District with Atlas", an 1882 monograph by Clarence E. Dutton

== Climate ==
Spring and fall are the most favorable seasons to visit Smithsonian Butte. According to the Köppen climate classification system, it is located in a Cold semi-arid climate zone, which is defined by the coldest month having an average mean temperature below 32 °F (0 °C), and at least 50% of the total annual precipitation being received during the spring and summer. This desert climate receives less than 10 inches (250 millimeters) of annual rainfall, and snowfall is generally light during the winter.

== See also ==
- Geology of the Zion and Kolob canyons area
- Colorado Plateau
