= Canaan Mountain Wilderness =

Wilderness area in Utah, US

- IUCN category Ib (wilderness area)
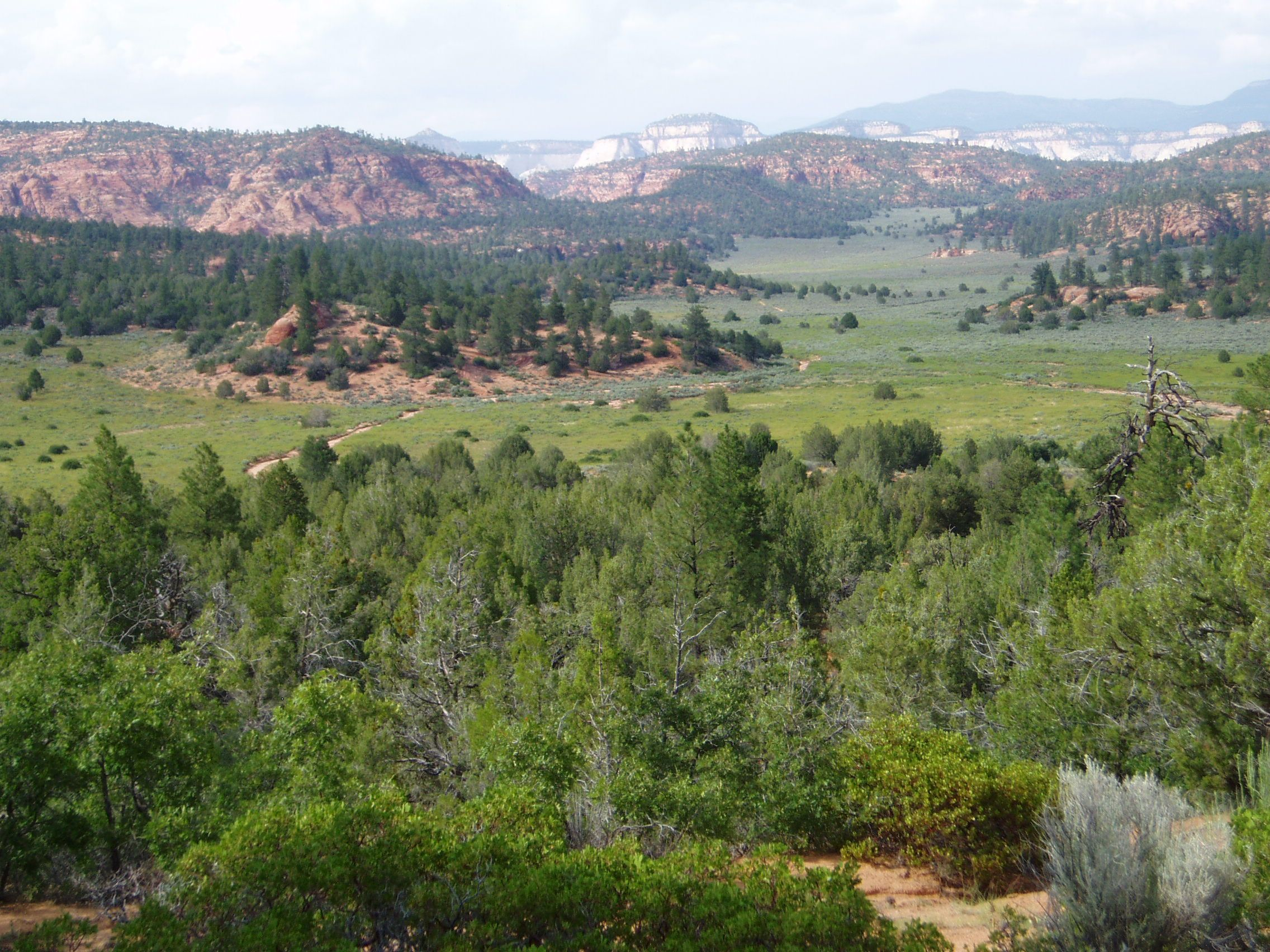

- Location within the United States
- Location: Washington County, Utah, USA
- Nearest city: Hildale, UT
- Coordinates: 37.08228°N 112.98315°W
- Area: 44,531 acres (180.2 km^{2})
- Established: March 30, 2009
- Governing body: Bureau of Land Management

Canaan Mountain Wilderness is a 44,531-acre (180.2 km^{2}) wilderness area in the US state of Utah. It was designated March 30, 2009, as part of the Omnibus Public Land Management Act of 2009. Located near the town of Hildale in southeastern Washington County, it borders Zion National Park to the north, Kane County to the east, and the state of Arizona to the south.

== Topography ==
Canaan Mountain is the namesake of the wilderness. It is a large promontory surrounded on three sides by the 2,000-foot (610 m) high White Cliffs composed of Navajo Sandstone. The 500-foot (150 m) Vermilion Cliffs, composed of the Moenave Formation, lie at the base of the White Cliffs. The two formations are separated by a wide bench of the Kayenta Formation's soft mudstones. The Navajo Sandstone surface of Canaan Mountain has been carved into ridges, hummocks, hollows, and passageways.

== Vegetation ==
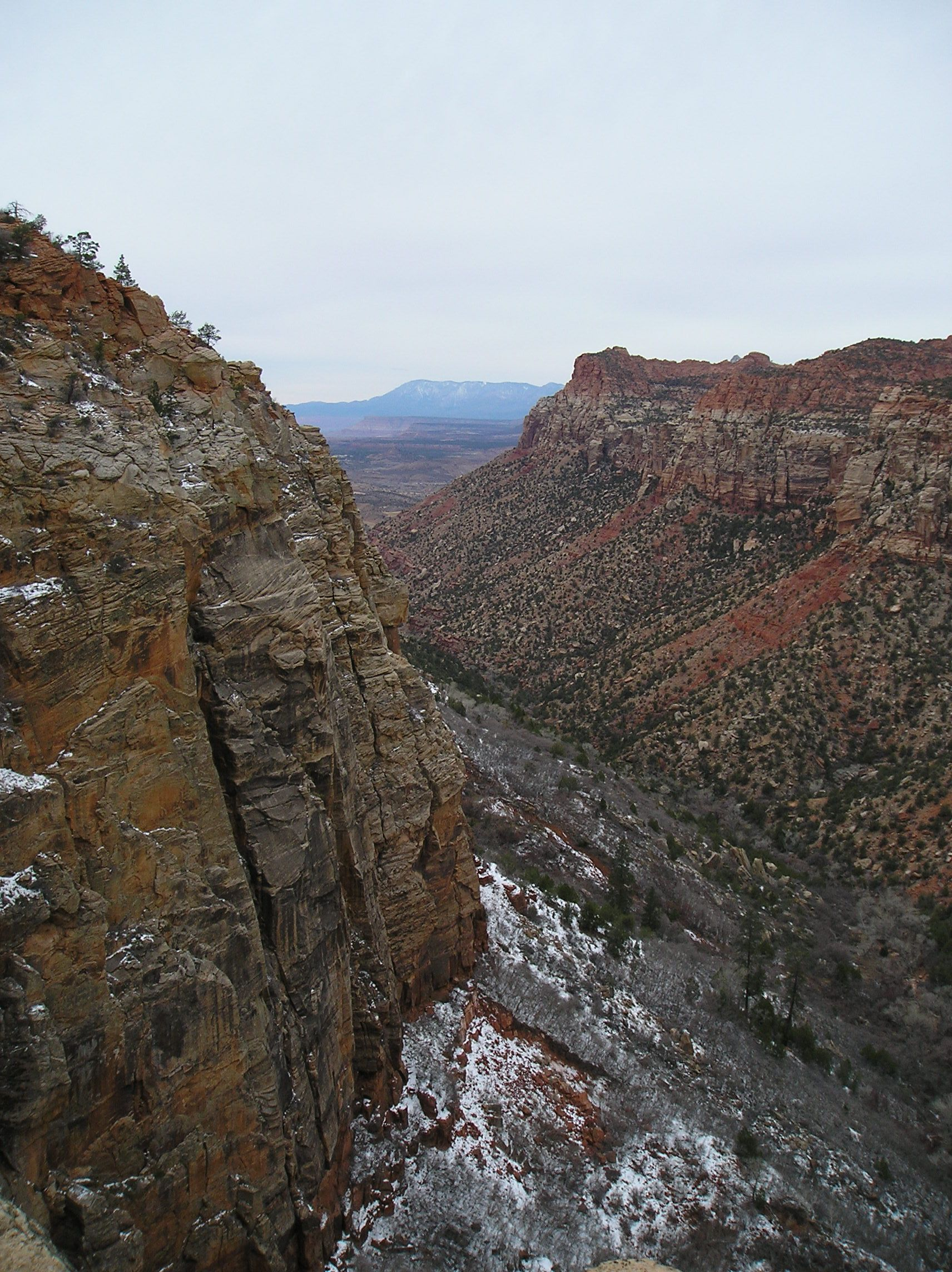
Canaan Mountain Wilderness

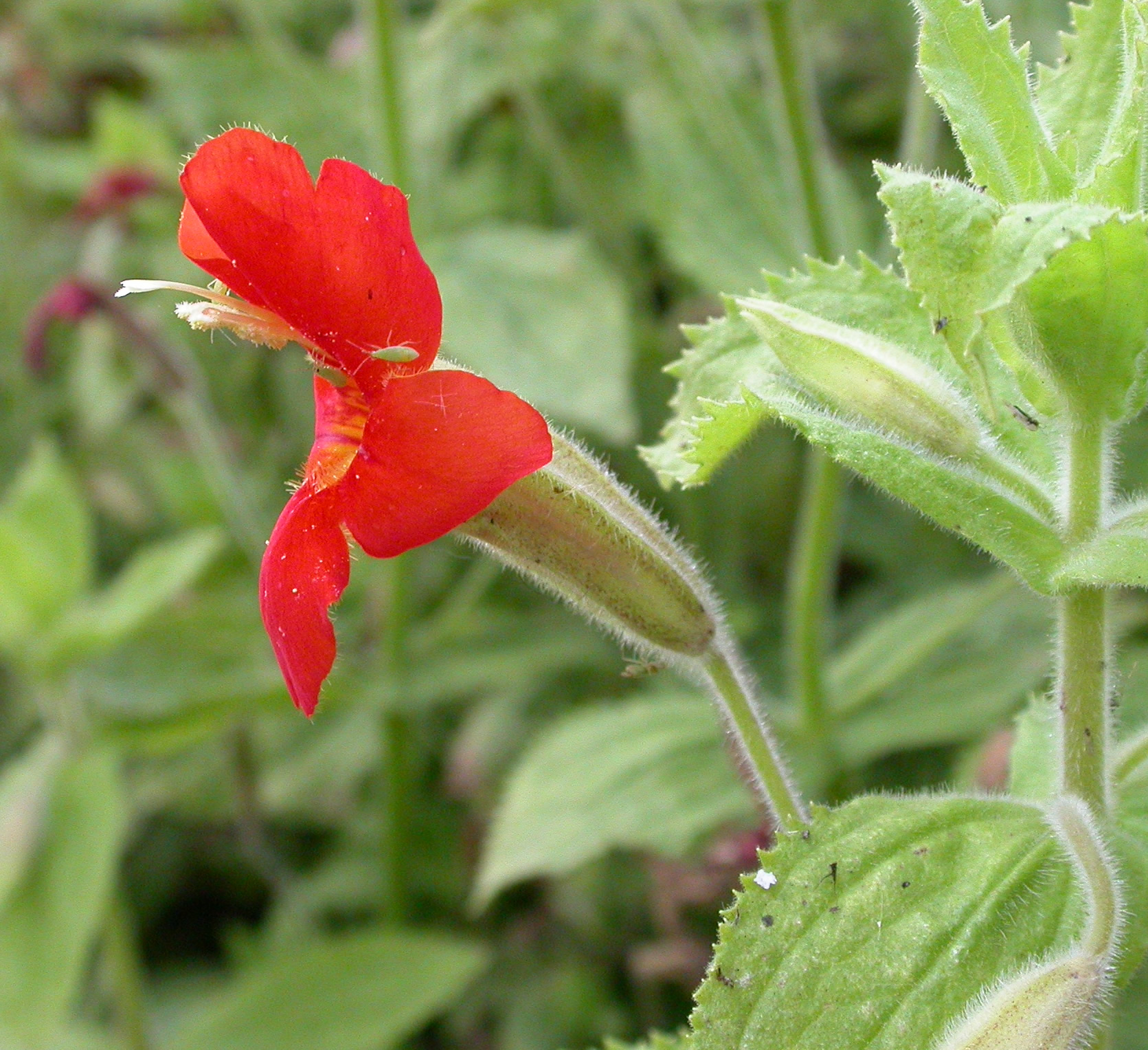
scarlet monkeyflower

Most of the area is dominated by ponderosa pine and Douglas fir scattered among large areas of slickrock. Pinyon pine, manzanita, Gambel oak, and Indian ricegrass are found on the pockets of soil amid the slickrock. The lower slopes on the eastern side of the wilderness and at the base of the White Cliffs support pinyon-juniper with serviceberry, manzanita, and various grasses. Riparian areas are found along South Creek, Water Canyon Creek, Squirrel Creek and several other drainages; maidenhair fern, shooting star, scarlet monkeyflower, and columbine grow in hanging gardens by cliff-side springs and seeps.

== Wildlife ==
The western half of Canaan Mountain Wilderness is home to a number of peregrine falcons. South Creek and the northwest side are important winter range for mule deer. Bighorn sheep were reintroduced in Zion National Park in 1977 and can now occasionally be found in the wilderness. Other animals include mountain lion, coyote, bobcat, Gambel's quail, mourning dove, several species of nesting raptor, and a number of sensitive animals including the desert shrew, spotted bat, Lewis's woodpecker, and golden eagle.

== Human history ==
Hunting camps of the Virgin River Ancestral Puebloans and Southern Paiutes are likely to be present, but are as yet unidentified. A pulley system and collapsed buildings are remnants of logging on Canaan Mountain between 1915 and 1928.

== Access ==
Trailheads into Canaan Mountain Wilderness are found south of Rockville and at Squirrel and Water canyons north of Colorado City, Arizona.

== See also ==
- List of U.S. Wilderness Areas
- Slickrock Trail
- Wilderness Act
- Smithsonian Butte
- Eagle Crags
