= Shunesburg Mountain =

Mountain in the state of Utah

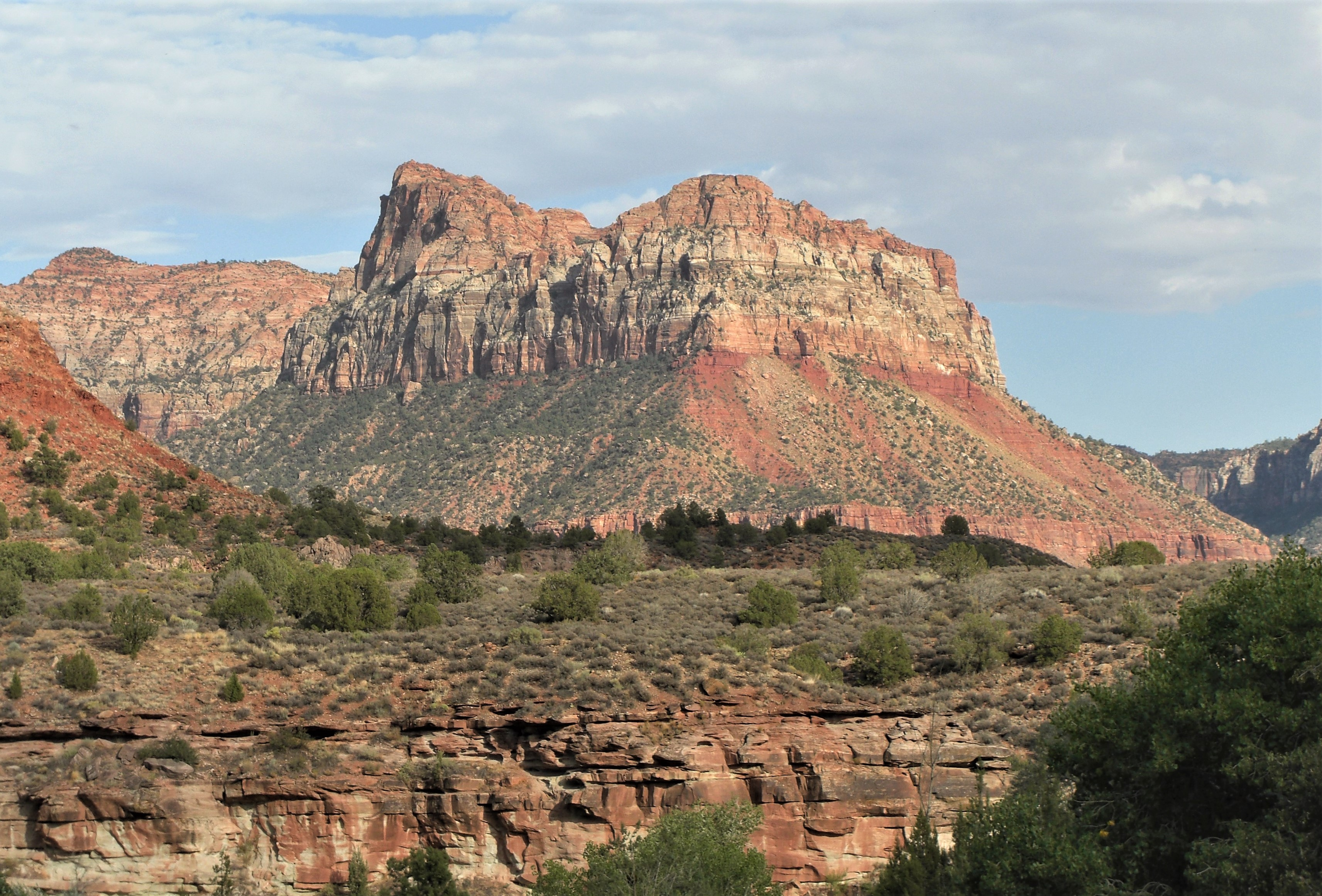
- Shunesburg Mountain, west aspect

Highest point
- Elevation: 5,960 ft (1,820 m)
- Prominence: 640 ft (200 m)
- Parent peak: Transview Mountain (6,321 ft)
- Isolation: 1.3 mi (2.1 km)
- Coordinates: 37°09′22″N 112°57′24″W

Geography
- Location within Utah Location within the United States
- Country: United States
- State: Utah
- County: Washington
- Protected area: Zion National Park
- Parent range: Colorado Plateau
- Topo map: USGS Springdale East

Geology
- Rock age: Jurassic
- Rock type: Navajo sandstone

Shunesburg Mountain is a 5,960-foot (1,820 m) mountain in Zion National Park in Washington County, Utah, United States.

== Description ==
Shunesburg Mountain is situated 3.4 mi (5.5 km) southeast of Springdale, towering 2,000 feet (610 meters) above the floor of Parunuweap Canyon. It is wedged between Shunes Creek and the East Fork Virgin River which drain precipitation runoff from this mountain. This geographical feature is named for the ghost town of Shunesburg which was set between the west aspect of this mountain, and Johnson Mountain, 2 mi (3.2 km) to the northwest directly across the mouth of Parunuweap Canyon. In turn, the town was named after Paiute Chief Shunes who sold the land in 1861 to the Mormon settlers who attempted to live there. Flooding from the Virgin River eventually forced the abandonment of the settlement, and drove the inhabitants to nearby Rockville.

== Climate ==
Spring and fall are the most favorable seasons to visit Shunesburg Mountain. According to the Köppen climate classification system, it is located in a Cold semi-arid climate zone, which is defined by the coldest month having an average mean temperature below 32 °F (0 °C), and at least 50% of the total annual precipitation being received during the spring and summer. This desert climate receives less than 10 inches (250 millimeters) of annual rainfall, and snowfall is generally light during the winter.

== See also ==
- List of mountains in Utah
- Geology of the Zion and Kolob canyons area
- Colorado Plateau
