= Mount Kinesava =

Sandstone mountain in the United States

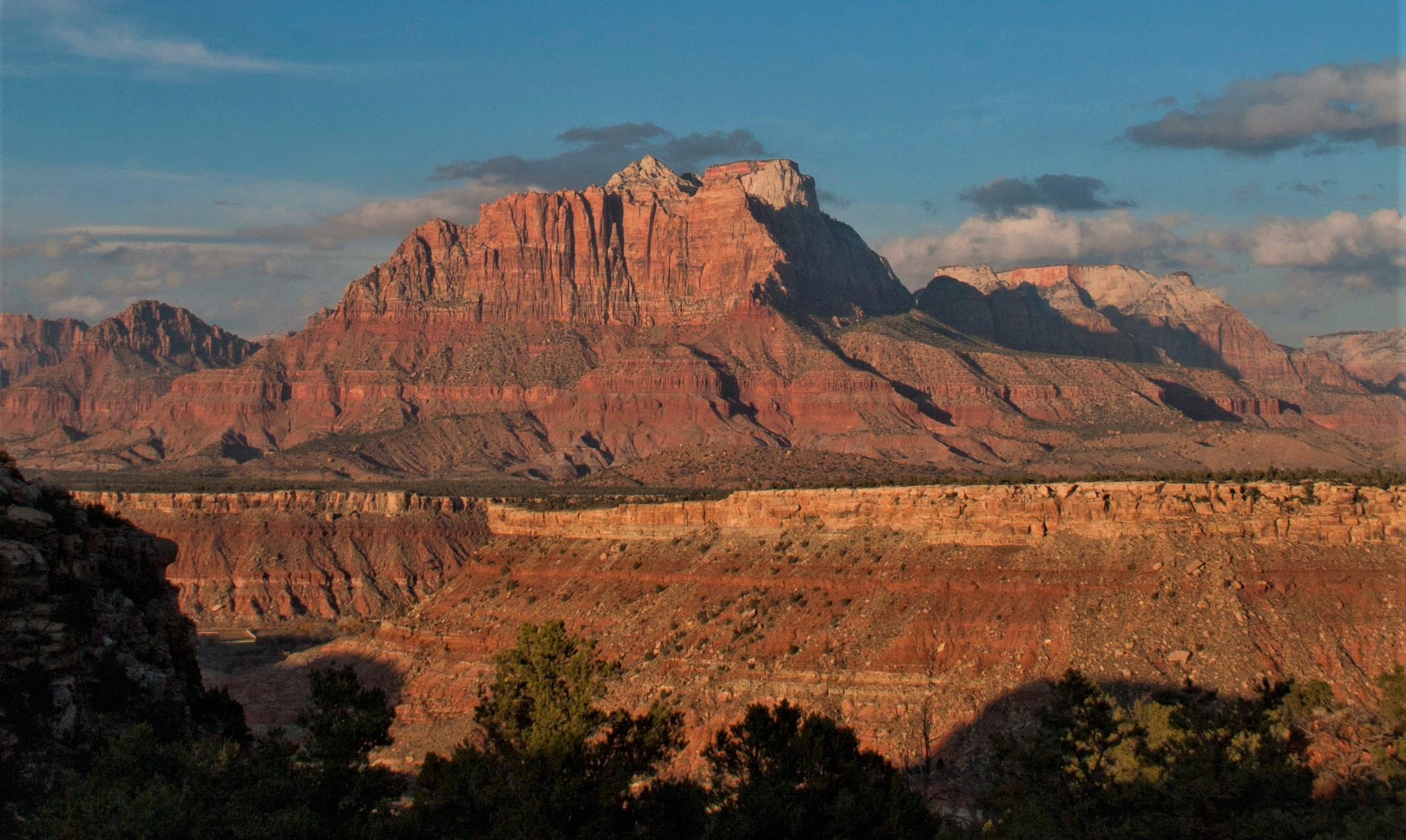
- Mount Kinesava, southwest aspect

Highest point
- Elevation: 7,285 ft (2,220 m)
- Prominence: 685 ft (209 m)
- Parent peak: The West Temple (7,810 ft)
- Isolation: 1.06 mi (1.71 km)
- Coordinates: 37°11′51″N 113°01′50″W

Geography
- Location within Utah Location within the United States
- Country: United States
- State: Utah
- County: Washington
- Protected area: Zion National Park
- Parent range: Markagunt Plateau; Colorado Plateau
- Topo map: USGS Springdale West

Geology
- Rock age: Jurassic
- Rock type: Navajo sandstone

Climbing
- Easiest route: class 4 scrambling

Mount Kinesava is a 7,285-foot (2,220 m) sandstone mountain summit located in Zion National Park, in Washington County of southwest Utah, United States.

== Description ==
Mount Kinesava is located immediately west of Springdale, towering 3,400 feet (1,000 meters) above the town and the floor of Zion Canyon. Precipitation runoff from this mountain drains into tributaries of the Virgin River. Its nearest higher neighbor is The West Temple, 1.06 mi (1.71 km) to the northeast. Other notable mountains within view from the summit include The Watchman 2.95 mi (4.75 km) to the east-southeast, Bridge Mountain 3.6 mi (5.8 km) to the east-northeast, and Mount Spry is positioned 4 mi (6.4 km) to the northeast. This feature's name was officially adopted in 1934 by the U.S. Board on Geographic Names. It is so named for Kinesava, the Paiute deity of trickery.

== Climate ==
Spring and fall are the most favorable seasons to visit Mount Kinesava. According to the Köppen climate classification system, it is located in a Cold semi-arid climate zone, which is defined by the coldest month having an average mean temperature below 32 °F (0 °C), and at least 50% of the total annual precipitation being received during the spring and summer. This desert climate receives less than 10 inches (250 millimeters) of annual rainfall, and snowfall is generally light during the winter.

== Geology ==
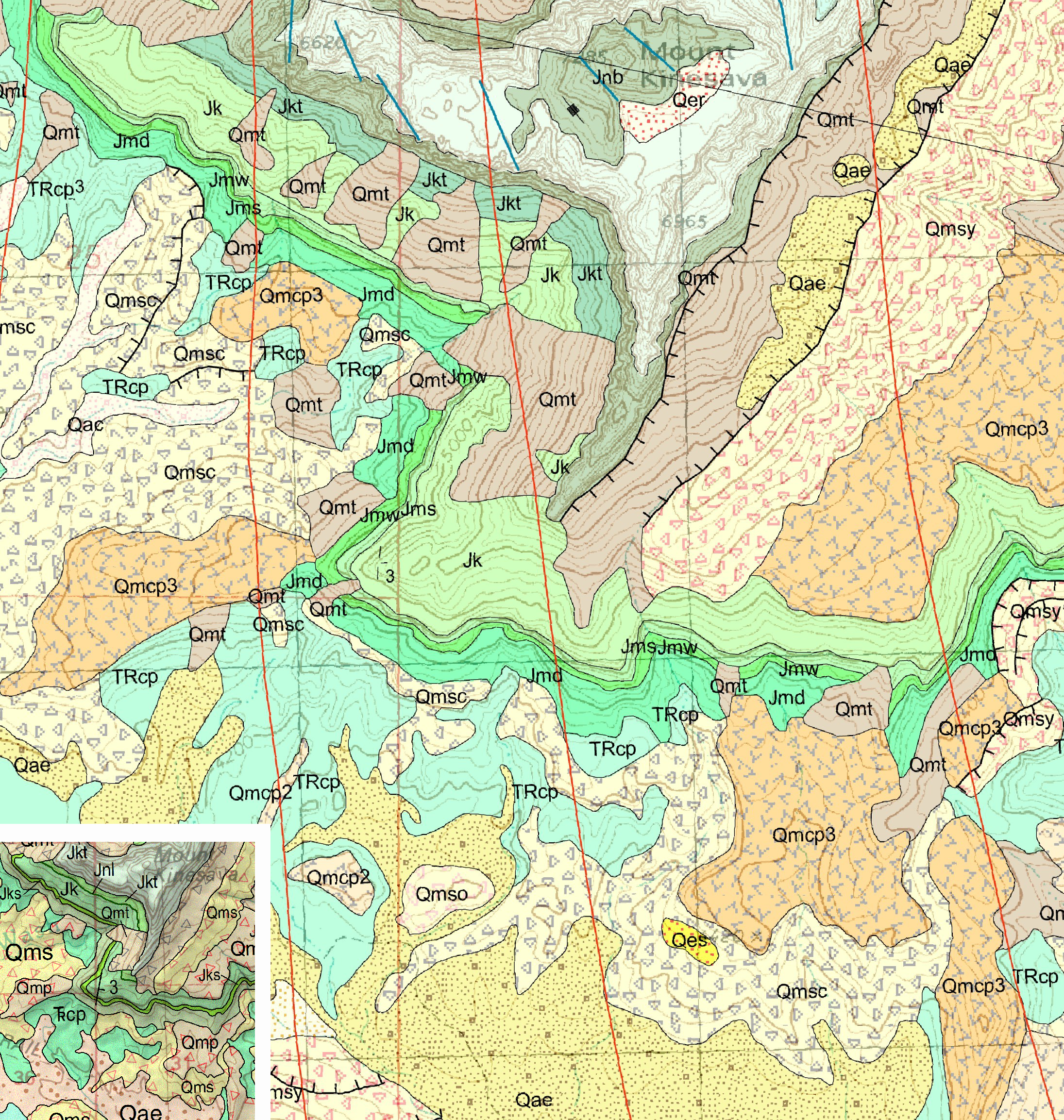
Mt. Kinesava geologic map

Stratification of sandstone deposits from vast dune fields laid down 175 to 200 million years ago can be seen exposed on the south aspect of the mountain. The uppermost 1,500 feet of this mountain is composed of light-colored Jurassic Navajo Sandstone. Below that layer is deep-red sandstone of the Kayenta Formation, probably best known for its dinosaur tracks, overlying the Springdale Sandstone Member. Continuing lower are the Whitmore Point Member and Dinosaur Canyon Member of the Moenave Formation. Near the base is the Petrified Forest Member of the Chinle Formation, surrounded by landslide deposits.

== Gallery ==
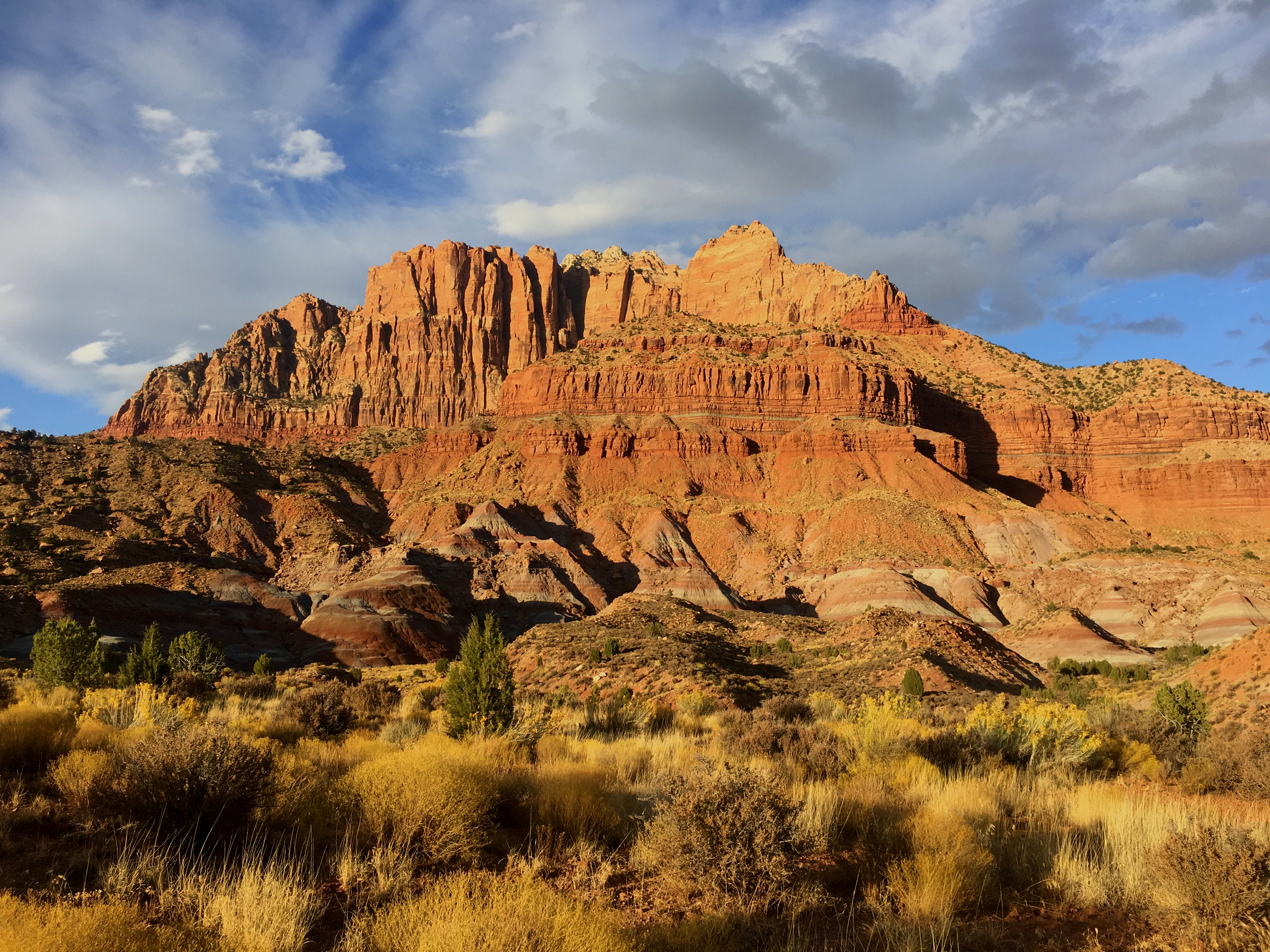

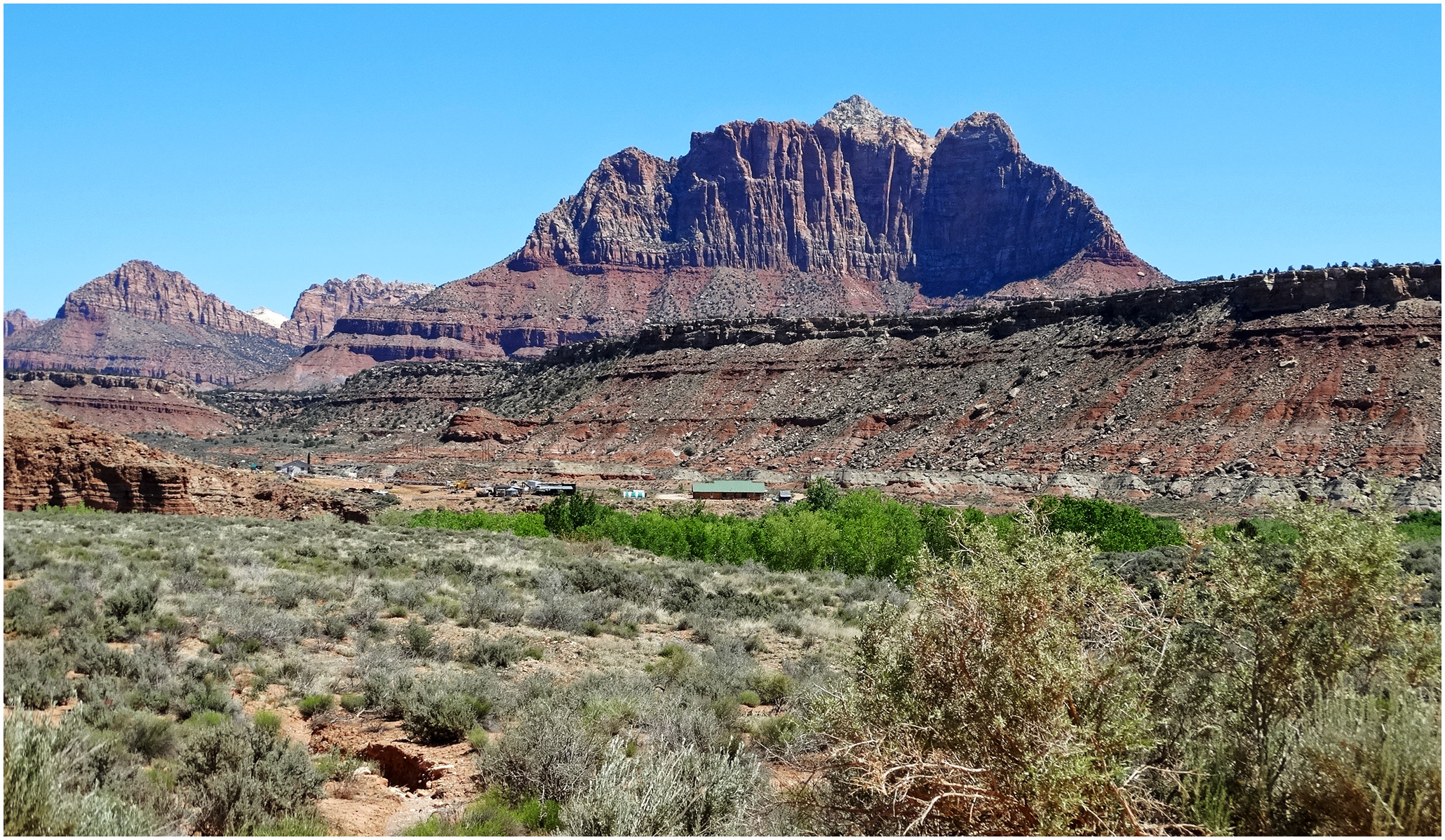

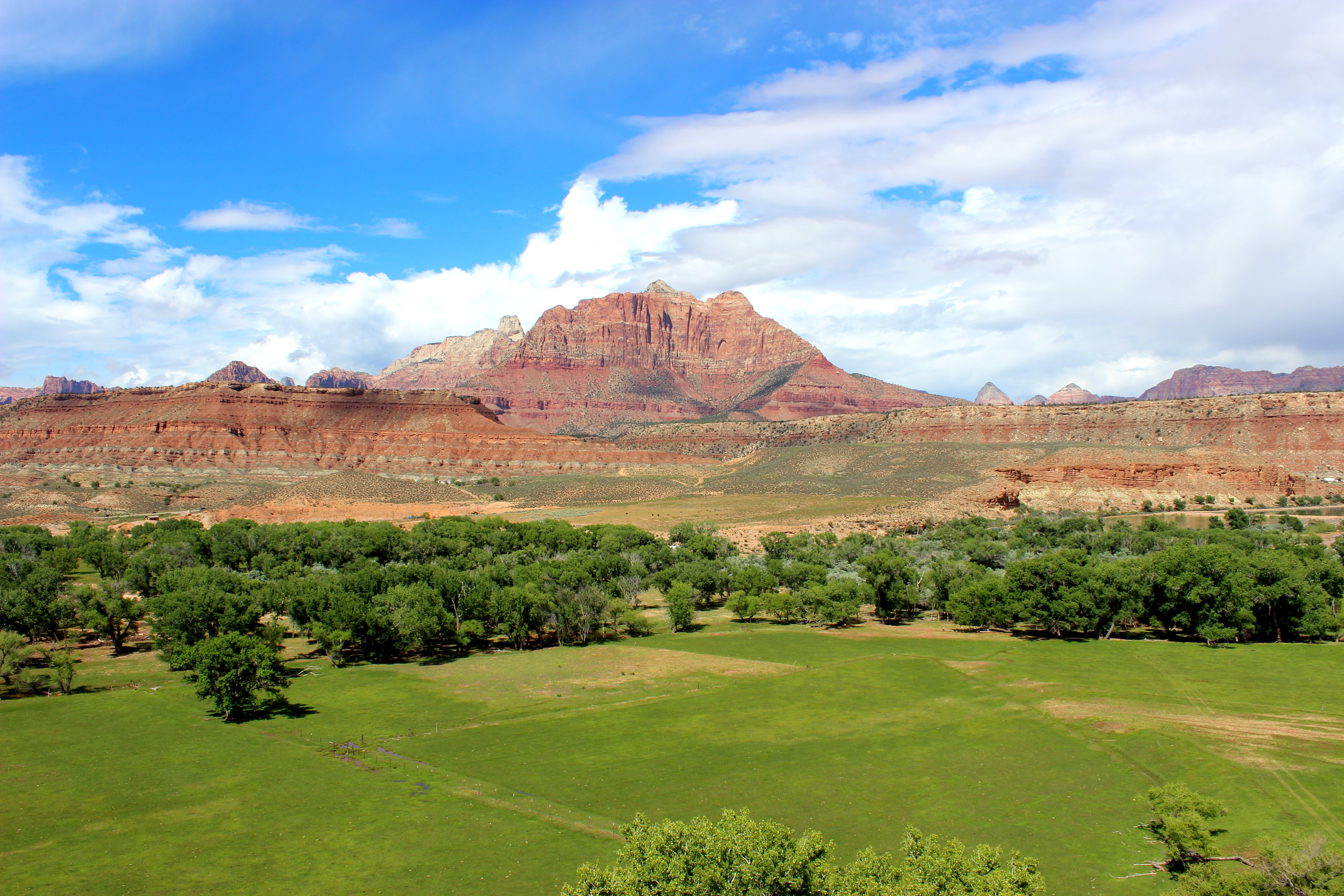

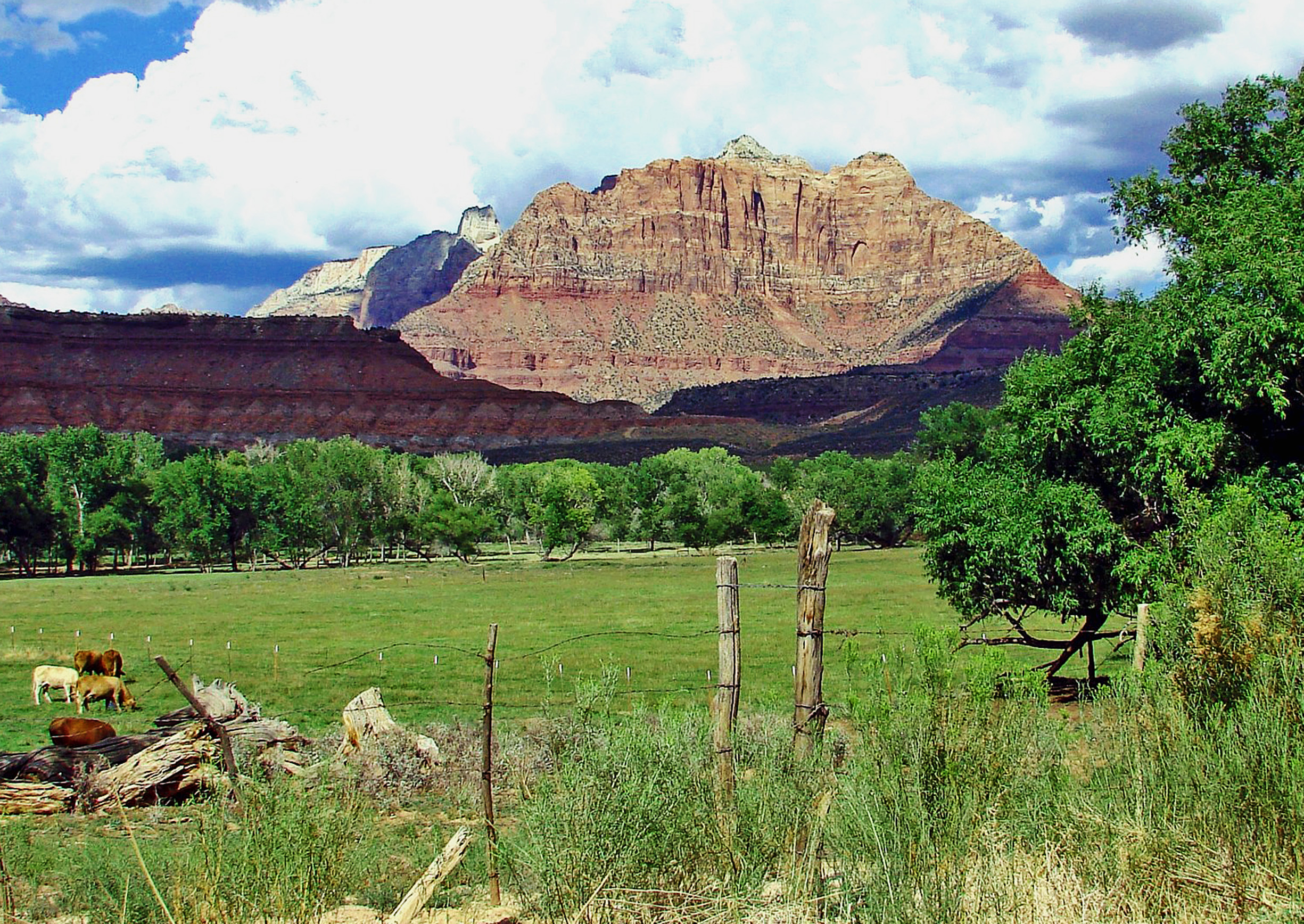

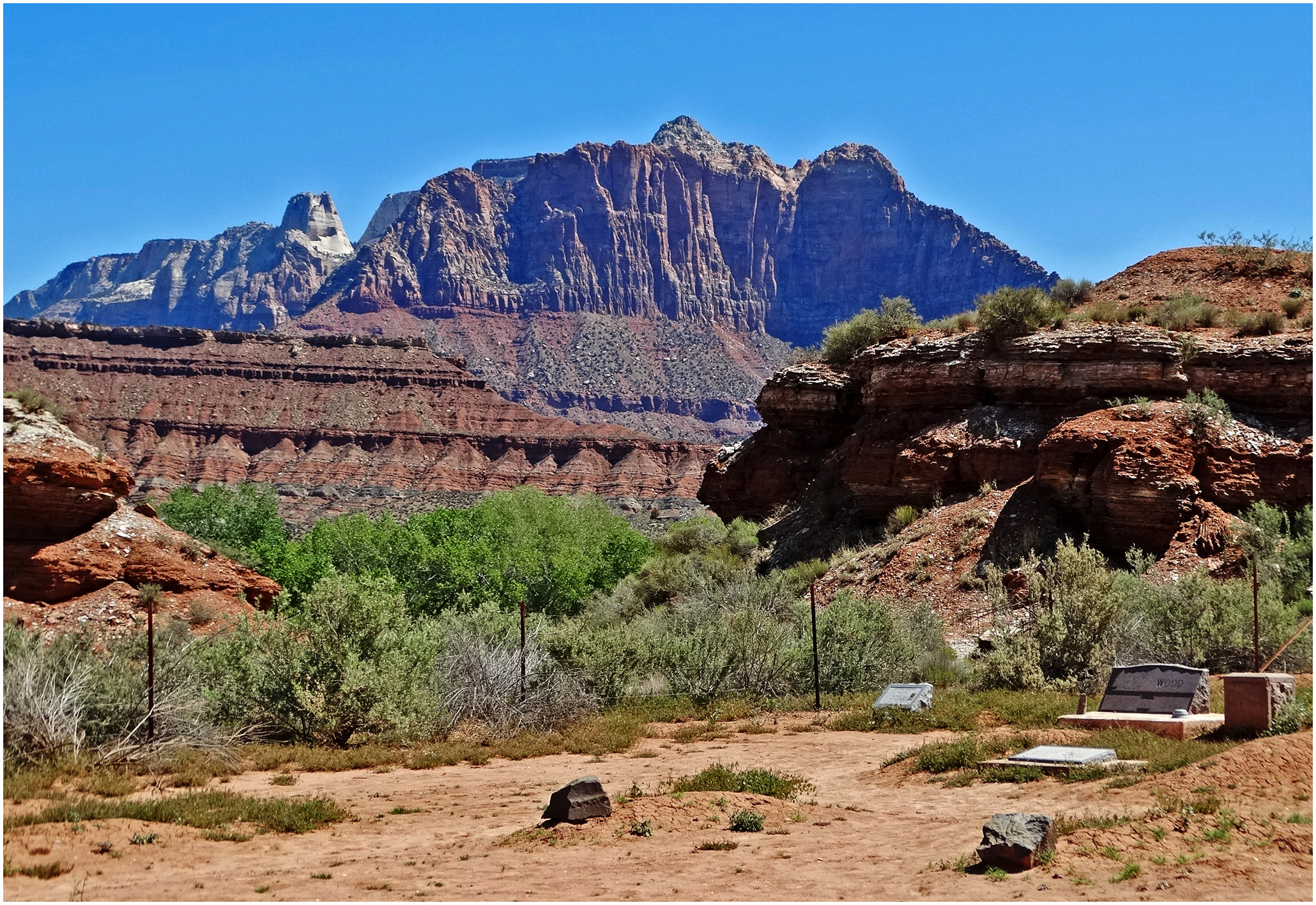
Mt. Kinesava centered, The Sundial to left

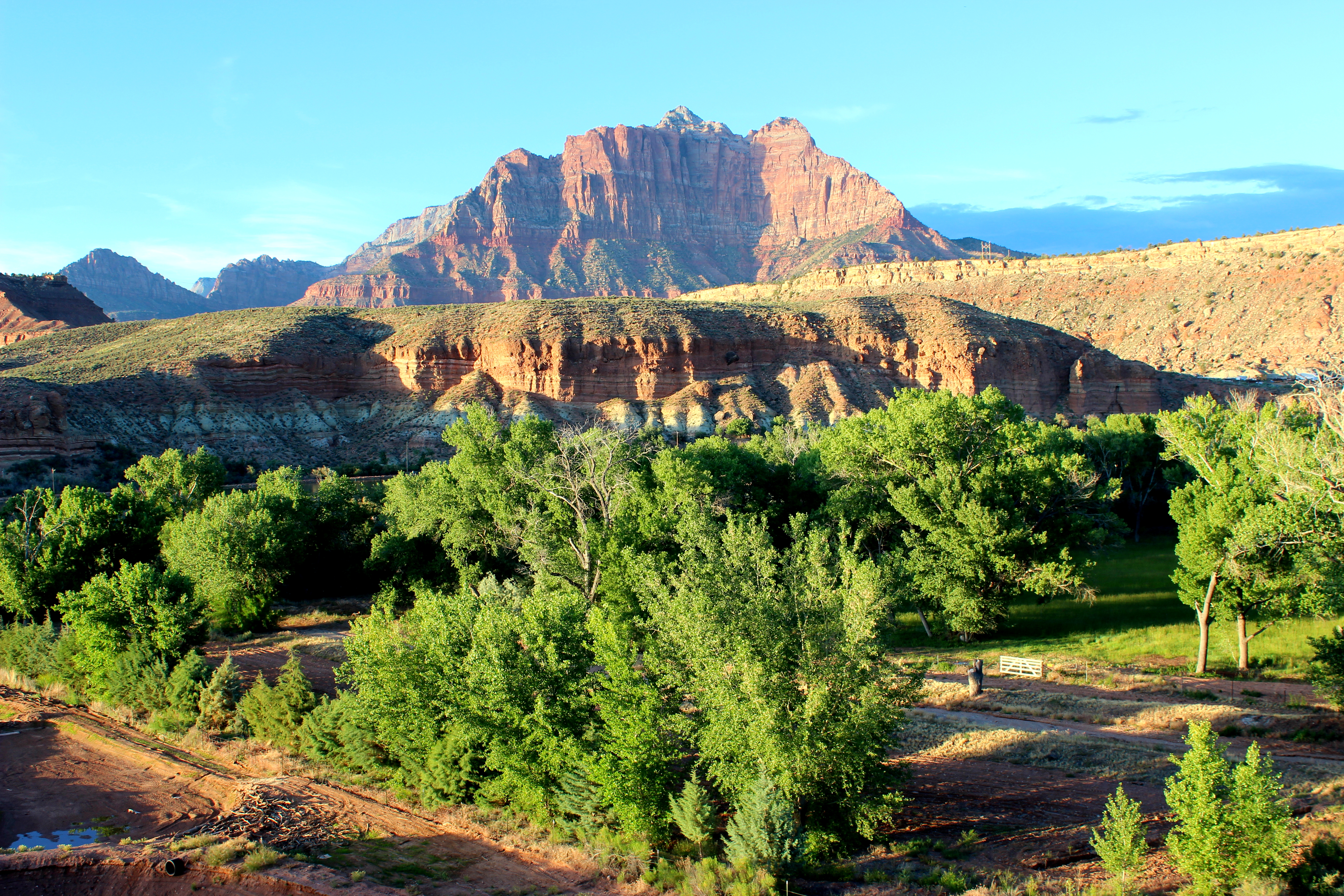

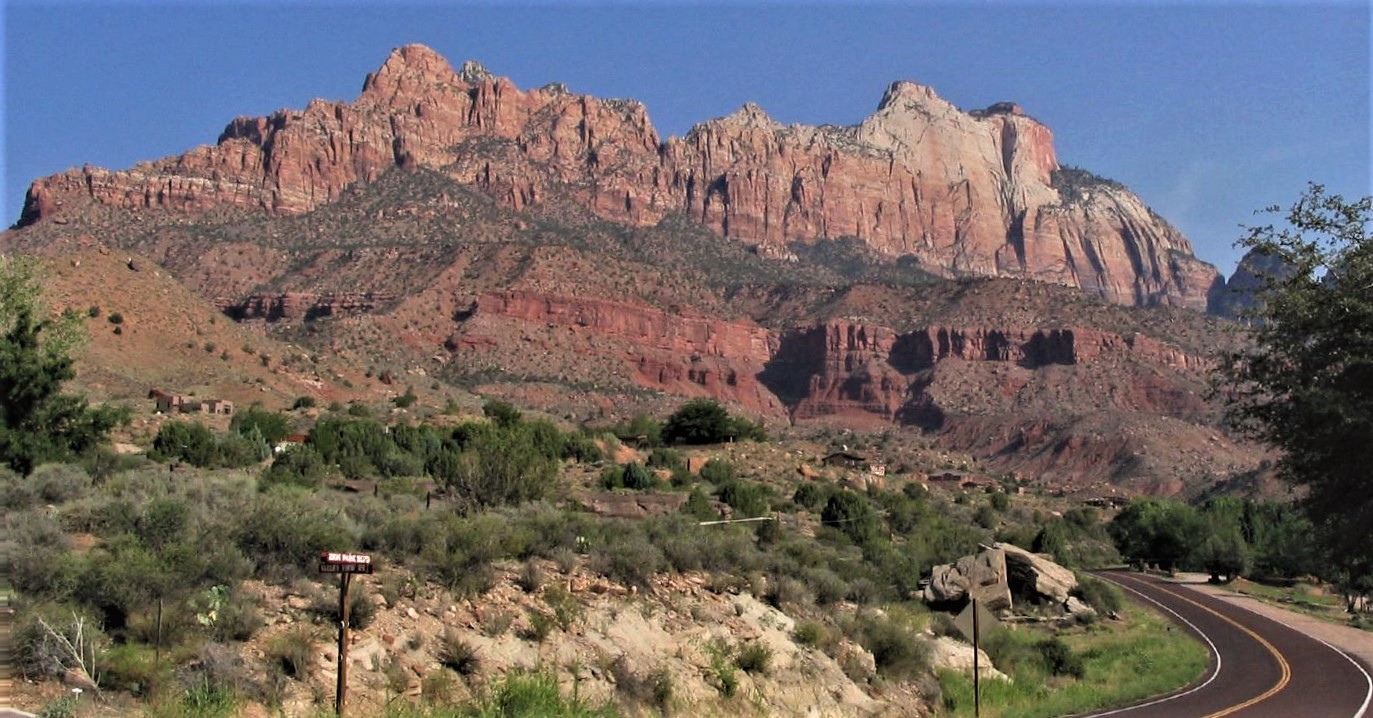
Mt. Kinesava (left), The West Temple (right) from southeast on Hwy 9

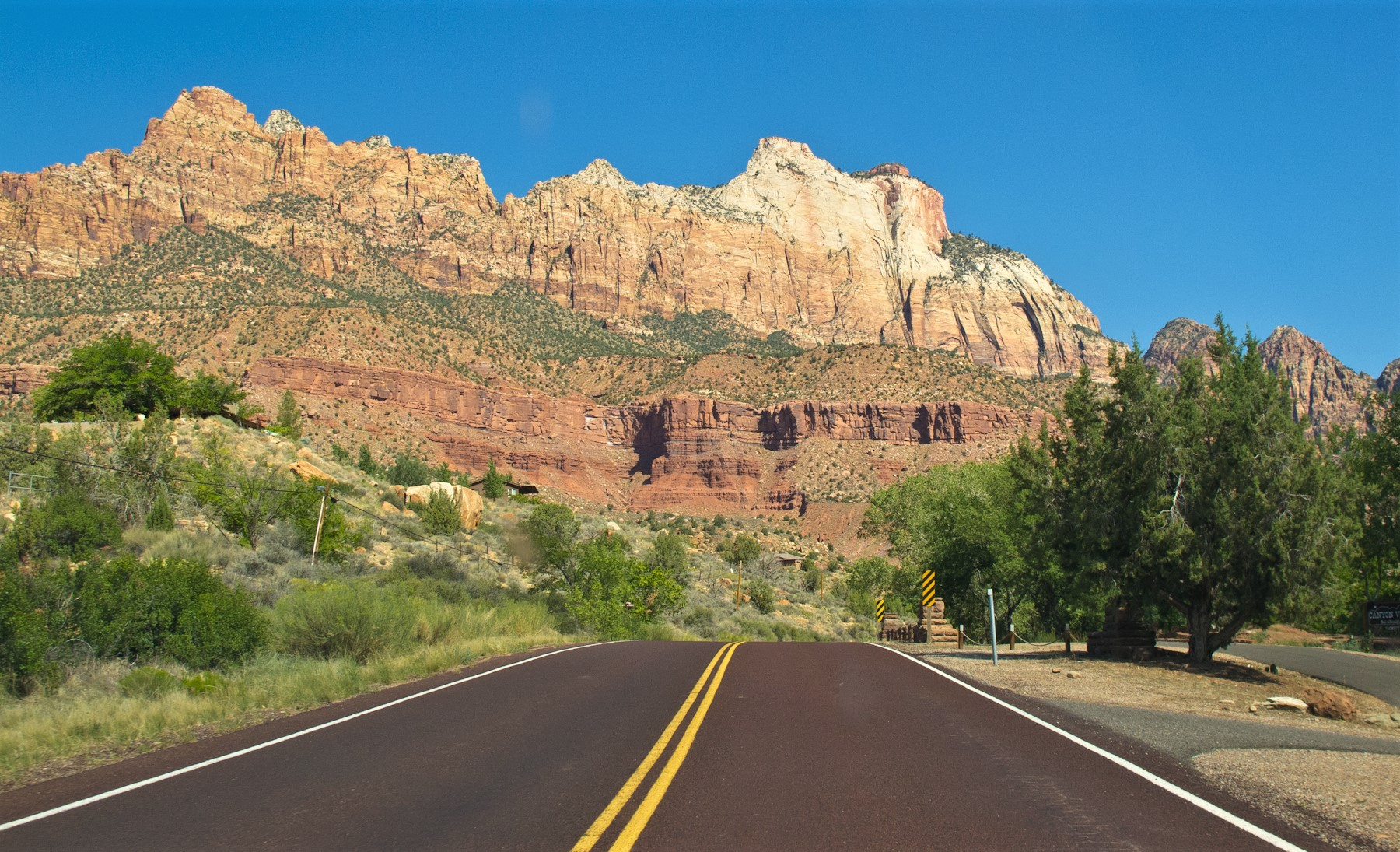
Mt. Kinesava (left), The West Temple straight ahead

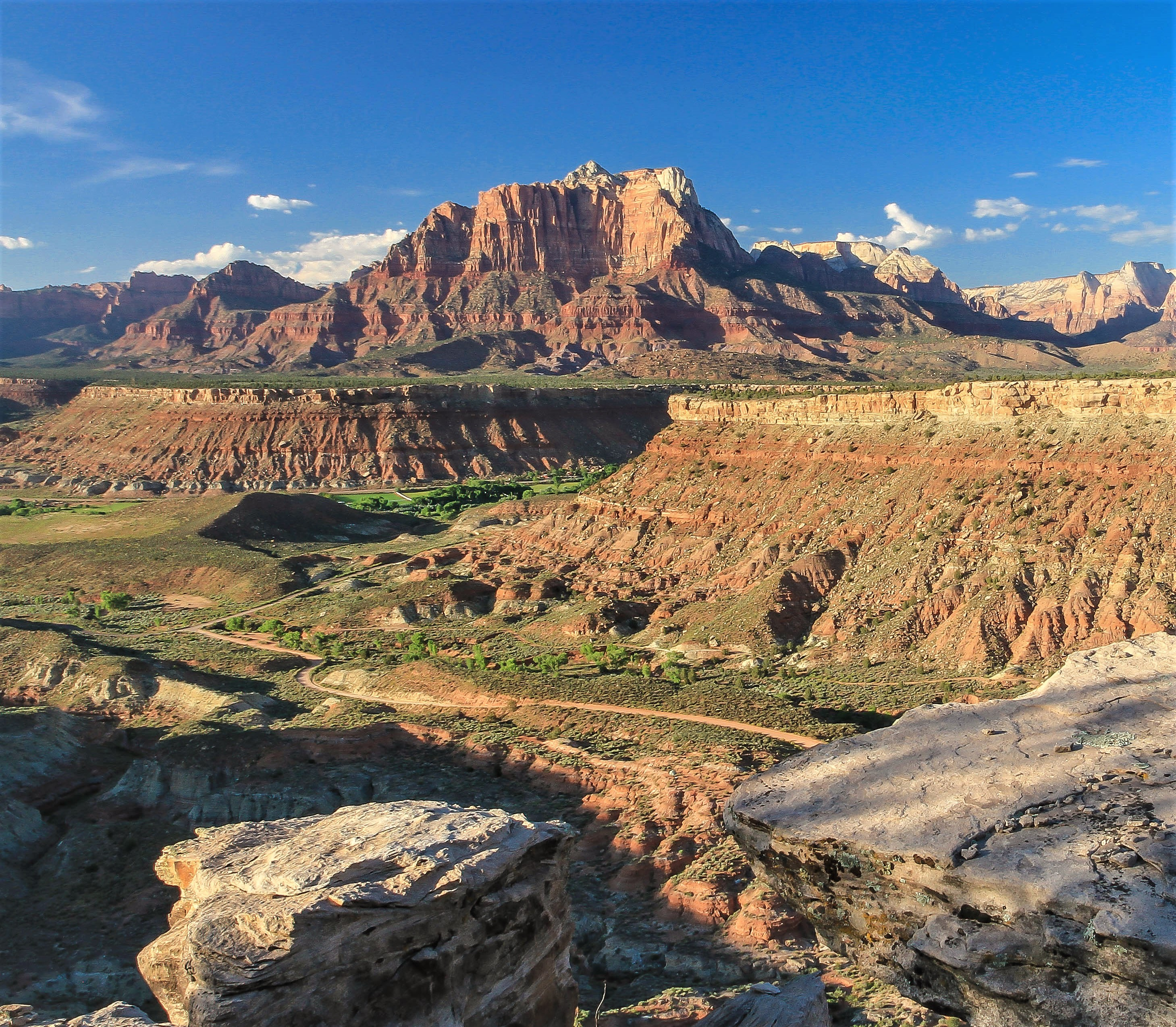

== See also ==
- Geology of the Zion and Kolob canyons area
- Markagunt Plateau
