= Cottonwood Canyon Wilderness =

Wilderness area in Utah, United States

- IUCN category Ib (wilderness area)
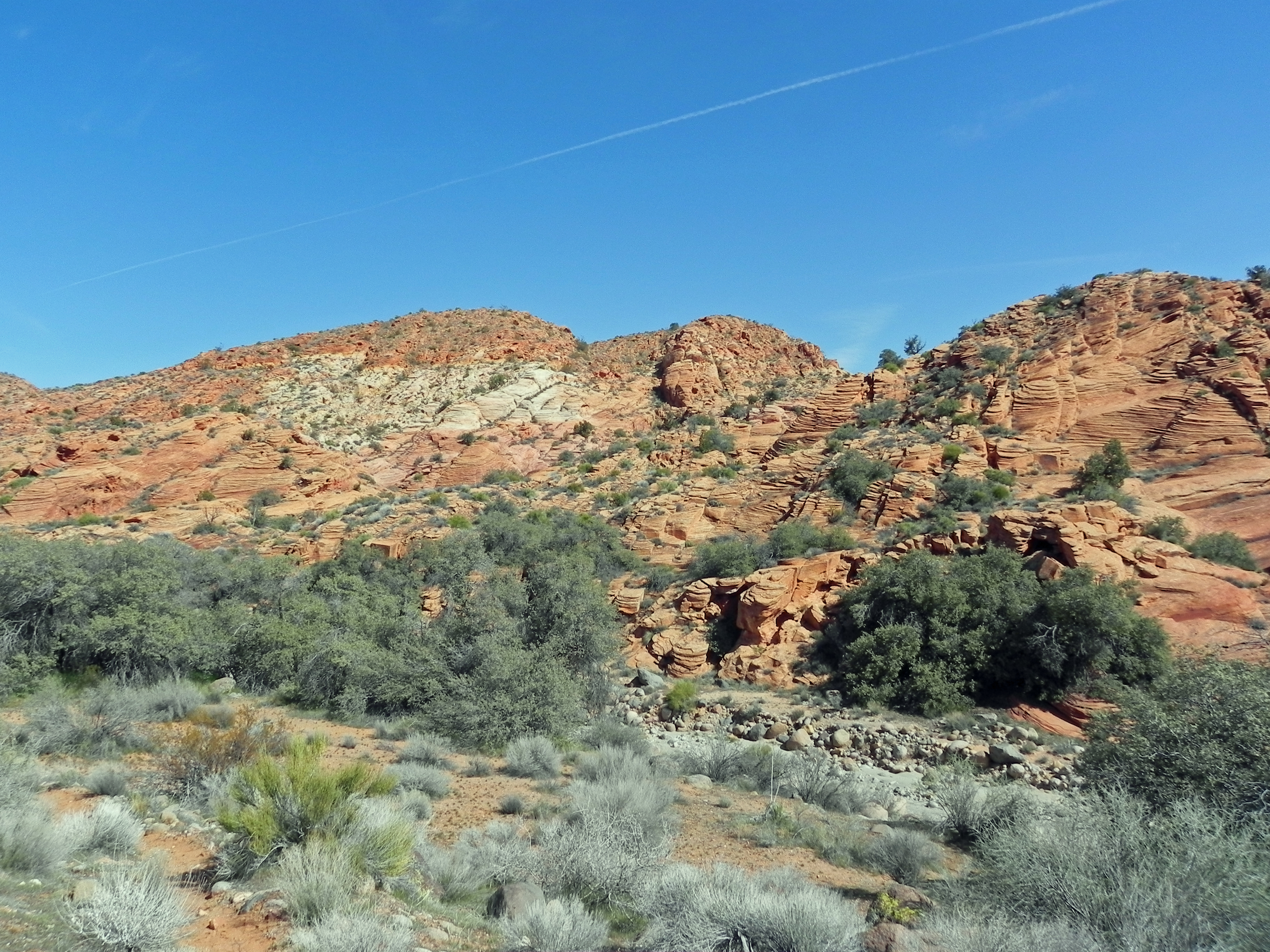
- Cottonwood Canyon

- Location within the United States
- Location: Washington County, Utah, United States
- Nearest city: Leeds, UT
- Coordinates: 37.2062°N 113.4758°W
- Area: 11,712 acres (47.4 km^{2})
- Established: March 30, 2009
- Governing body: Bureau of Land Management

Cottonwood Canyon Wilderness is a 11,712-acre (47.4 km^{2}) wilderness area in the US state of Utah. It was designated March 30, 2009, as part of the Omnibus Public Land Management Act of 2009. Located adjacent to the southern edge of the Dixie National Forest, it encompasses and protects a transition zone between the Colorado Plateau to the east and the Mojave Desert to the west. It is bordered by the Cottonwood Forest Wilderness to the northeast and is itself (along with Red Mountain Wilderness to its west) a part of the Red Cliffs National Conservation Area.

== Vegetation ==
Vegetation in Cottonwood Canyon Wilderness includes pockets of yucca, cholla, and mesquite, as well as riparian vegetation such as Fremont cottonwood along several intermittent streams. Higher up toward the Pine Valley Mountains are pinyon pine and juniper. The endangered purple-spined hedgehog cactus (Echinocereus engelmannii var. purpureus) may occur in the area.

== Wildlife ==
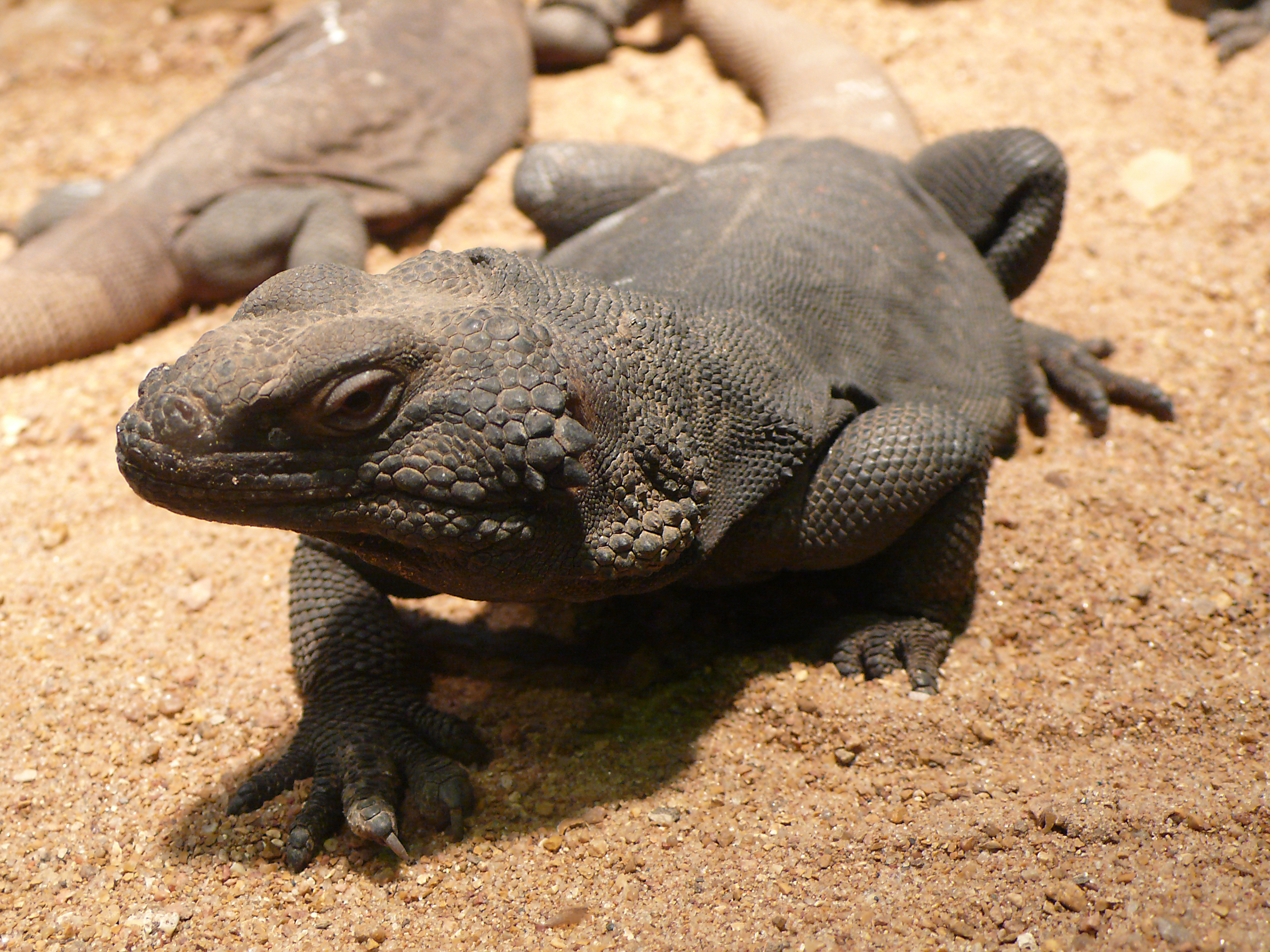
Chuckwalla

A variety of wildlife is found in Cottonwood Canyon Wilderness, including mule deer, mountain lion, bobcat, and kit fox, as well as Gila monster and chuckawalla - both of which are on the State of Utah's list of sensitive species due to shrinking habitat. The federally threatened desert tortoise can also be found in the wilderness. Common bird species include Gambel's quail, mourning dove, prairie falcon, golden eagle, bald eagle, peregrine falcon, and the more common red-tailed, Cooper's, and sharp-shinned hawks.

== Recreation ==
There are several miles of hiking and horseback riding trails in Cottonwood Canyon Wilderness. All vehicles including bicycles are prohibited in the wilderness. There are also opportunities for rock climbing and wildlife viewing in the wilderness. Visitors should practice Leave No Trace principles.

== See also ==
- List of U.S. Wilderness Areas
- Wilderness Act
