= Pole Creek Fire (2018) =

2018 wildfire in Utah, United States

- Part of the 2018 Utah wildfires
- Date: September 6, 2018 – October 6, 2018
- Location: Uinta National Forest, Juab County, Utah, United States (12 miles [19 km] northeast of Nephi)
- Coordinates: 39.806°N 111.661°W

Statistics
- Burned area: 98,642 acres (399.19 km^{2})

Impacts
- Deaths: 0
- Injuries: 0
- Structures lost: 0
- Cost: $4.7 million

Ignition
- Cause: Lightning

Map
- Start location of Pole Creek Fire Pole Creek Fire (2018) (the United States)

The Pole Creek Fire was a lightning-caused fire in Juab, Sanpete, and Utah counties in central Utah in the Western United States. The fire is the largest in Utah in 2018. The fire was first reported on Thursday September 6, 2018. It merged with the Bald Mountain Fire on Monday September 17, 2018. The Bald Mountain Fire caused mandatory evacuation of two cities: Elk Ridge and Woodland Hills. The Pole Creek Fire triggered mandatory evacuations for the Covered Bridge Community of the Spanish Fork Canyon along with the Diamond Fork Canyon and Right Fork Hobble Creek Canyon areas.

== Timeline ==
=== August 2018 ===
The Bald Mountain Fire was started by lightning on August 24, 2018.

=== September 2018 ===
The Pole Creek Fire was started by lightning on 6 September 2018. On September 12, high winds and low relative humidity caused both the Pole Creek and Bald Mountain fires to expand rapidly, threatening the communities of Elk Ridge and Woodland Hills. On September 17, 2018, the two fires were confirmed to have combined.

=== October 2018 ===
The fire was reported contained on 6 October 2018.

== Impacts ==
=== Evacuations ===
Both fires have led to the evacuation of more than 2,000 homes and around 6,000 people.

=== Transportation ===
The fire closed U.S. Route 6 in Spanish Fork Canyon and U.S. Route 89 (from Thistle south to the Utah-Sanpete county line) for several days. Several other canyon roads in the area are also closed.
