= Scarlet penstemon =

List of plants with the same or similar names

Scarlet penstemon is a common name of at least two species of penstemon:

- Penstemon barbatus
- Penstemon rostriflorus
