= Signal Peak (Utah) =

Mountain in the American state of Utah

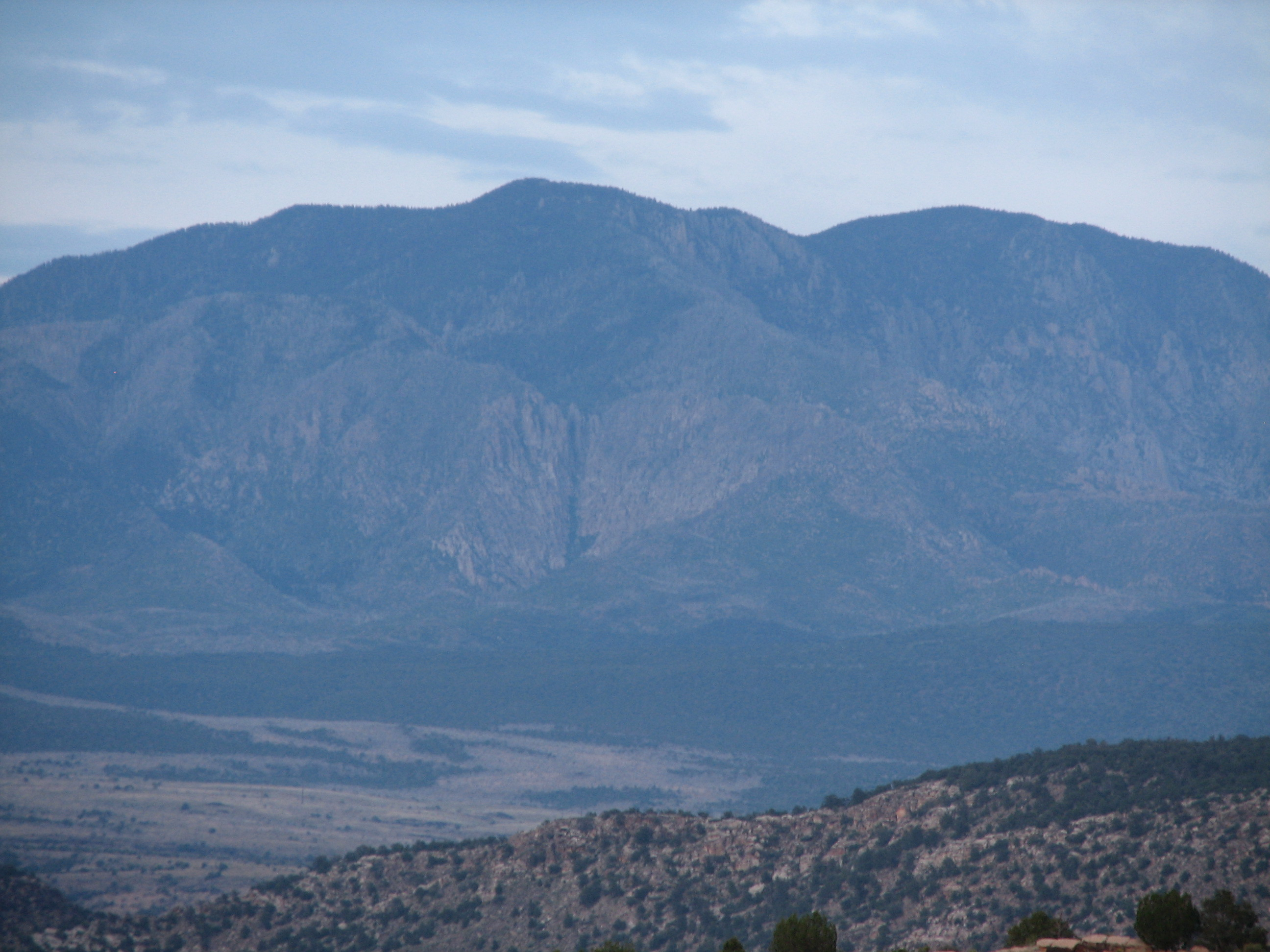
- Signal Peak

Highest point
- Elevation: 10,369 ft (3,160 m) NAVD 88
- Prominence: 4,485 ft (1,367 m)
- Listing: Utah county high points 21st; Great Basin Peaks List
- Coordinates: 37°19′11″N 113°29′30″W

Geography
- Location within Utah
- Location: Washington County, Utah, U.S.
- Parent range: Pine Valley Mountains
- Topo map: USGS Signal Peak

Signal Peak, with an elevation of 10,369 feet (3,160 m), is the highest peak in the Pine Valley Mountains and in Washington County in southwestern Utah, United States. Signal Peak is located north of the city of St. George and south of the community of Pine Valley in the Dixie National Forest. The summit is the highest point in the Pine Valley Mountain Wilderness.

Signal Peak is in the watershed of tributaries of the Virgin River, which itself is a tributary of the Colorado River.

A trail to the top can be found at Oak Grove campground near the neighboring city of Leeds, Utah.

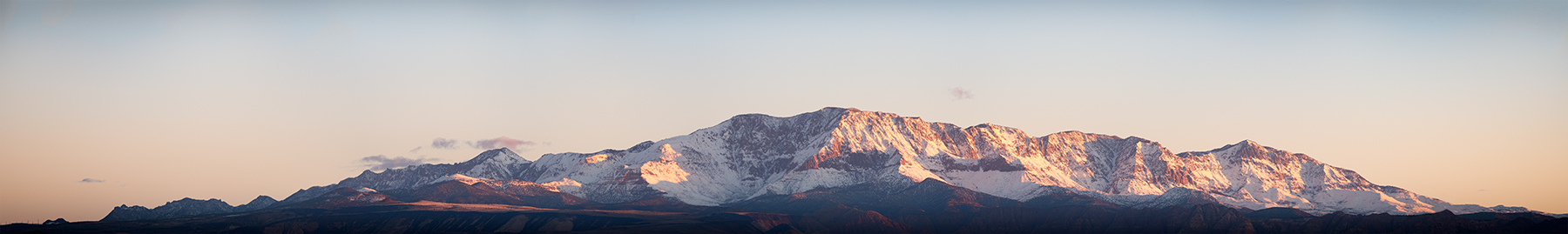
Signal Peak is the highest point in the Pine Valley Mountains
