= Cottonwood Forest Wilderness =

Protected wilderness area in Utah, United States

Cottonwood Canyon Wilderness
- IUCN category Ib (wilderness area)
- Location within Utah Location within the United States
- Location: Washington County, Utah, U.S.
- Nearest city: Leeds, UT
- Coordinates: 37.2062°N 113.4758°W
- Area: 2,643 acres (10.7 km^{2})
- Established: March 30, 2009
- Governing body: U.S. Forest Service

Cottonwood Forest Wilderness is a 2,643-acre (10.7 km^{2}) wilderness area in the US state of Utah. It was designated March 30, 2009, as part of the Omnibus Public Land Management Act of 2009. Located within the Dixie National Forest near the base of the Pine Valley Mountains, it is adjacent to the Cottonwood Canyon Wilderness, which is part of the Red Cliffs National Conservation Area.

== See also ==
- List of U.S. Wilderness Areas
- Wilderness Act
