= Dollar Ridge Fire =

2018 wildfire in Utah, United States

- Part of the 2018 Utah wildfires
- Date: July 1, 2018 – October 2018
- Location: Ashley National Forest in Utah, United States
- Coordinates: 40.1°N 110.96°W

Statistics
- Burned area: 68,869 acres (279 km^{2})
- Land use: National forest

Impacts
- Deaths: None
- Injuries: None
- Structures lost: 170

Ignition
- Cause: Human

Map
- Location of fire in Utah

Location of Dollar Ridge Fire

The Dollar Ridge Fire was a wildfire that burned in Ashley National Forest in Utah in the United States during July 2018. It consumed 68,869 acres (279 km^{2}), making it the second-largest wildfire of the 2018 Utah wildfire season. (Note: While the total acreage of the Goose Creek Fire was higher (132,220 acres [535 km^{2}]), it originated in Nevada and only burned 68,431 acres (277 km^{2}) in Utah.) The fire prompted the evacuation of 200-300 people and destroyed or damaged 80 homes and nearly 400 trailers, sheds, and vehicles.

== Events ==
The Dollar Ridge Fire started on private property around 1:00 pm Mountain Daylight Time on July 1, 2018. By evening, it had grown to 7,000 acres (28 km^{2}). The fire continued to grow to 30,000 acres (121 km^{2}) on July 2, prompting evacuations of 200-300 homes in Strawberry Gorge, Camelot Resort, the Current Creek subdivision, and Pinyon Ridge subdivision. Red Cross evacuation centers were established at the Fruitland Chapel of the Church of Jesus Christ of Latter-day Saints and the Duchesne High School.

By July 3, 191 fire personnel and 2 helicopters had been allocated to the fire, but hazardous conditions limited their ability to respond to the rapidly growing fire. The escalating situation prompted the evacuation of two more neighborhoods on July 4, and a Type 1 incident management team (IMT) arrived to assume management of the fire.

Over the next few days, firefighters successfully slowed the growth of the fire with the support of aerial resources, which by this point included Super Scooper aircraft. A turning point occurred on July 7, when cloud cover and light rain helped to moderate fire activity, resulting in 30% containment of the fire. Favorable weather continued to aid firefighters over the next several days, with containment increasing to 60% by July 11, allowing local officials to lift some of the evacuation orders.

As fire activity continued to diminish, firefighters and other resources were released or reassigned. Management of the fire was downgraded to a Type 2 IMT on July 18, and remaining evacuation orders were lifted on July 22. However, the southwest section of the fire perimeter continued to prove problematic due to the inaccessibility of its terrain. Containment was measured at 93% on July 23, but was subsequently lowered during the first week of August back down to 90%. Fire management was eventually downgraded again to a Type 3 IMT before being returned to local personnel. The final incident update was posted on August 31, and later reports indicated that full containment was finally achieved in October 2018.

== Impact ==
The Dollar Ridge Fire consumed 68,869 acres (279 km^{2}) of land and caused extensive property loss, destroying 74 homes and damaging 6 others. Additionally, 131 camp trailers, 81 utility trailers, 158 sheds, and 25 vehicles were destroyed. Further property damage was later caused by debris flow caused by late-summer storms in the burned-out areas.

Additionally, ash run-off from the fire devastated the popular Strawberry River fishery and is predicted to have an impact on municipal water supplies. The Utah Division of Wildlife Resources began habitat restoration efforts in November 2018, focusing their efforts on the river basin. Department officials estimate that it will take 3–5 years for vegetation to fill back in and for fish populations to recover from the effects of the fire.

The fire is believed to the result of human activity, but the exact cause was never determined.
