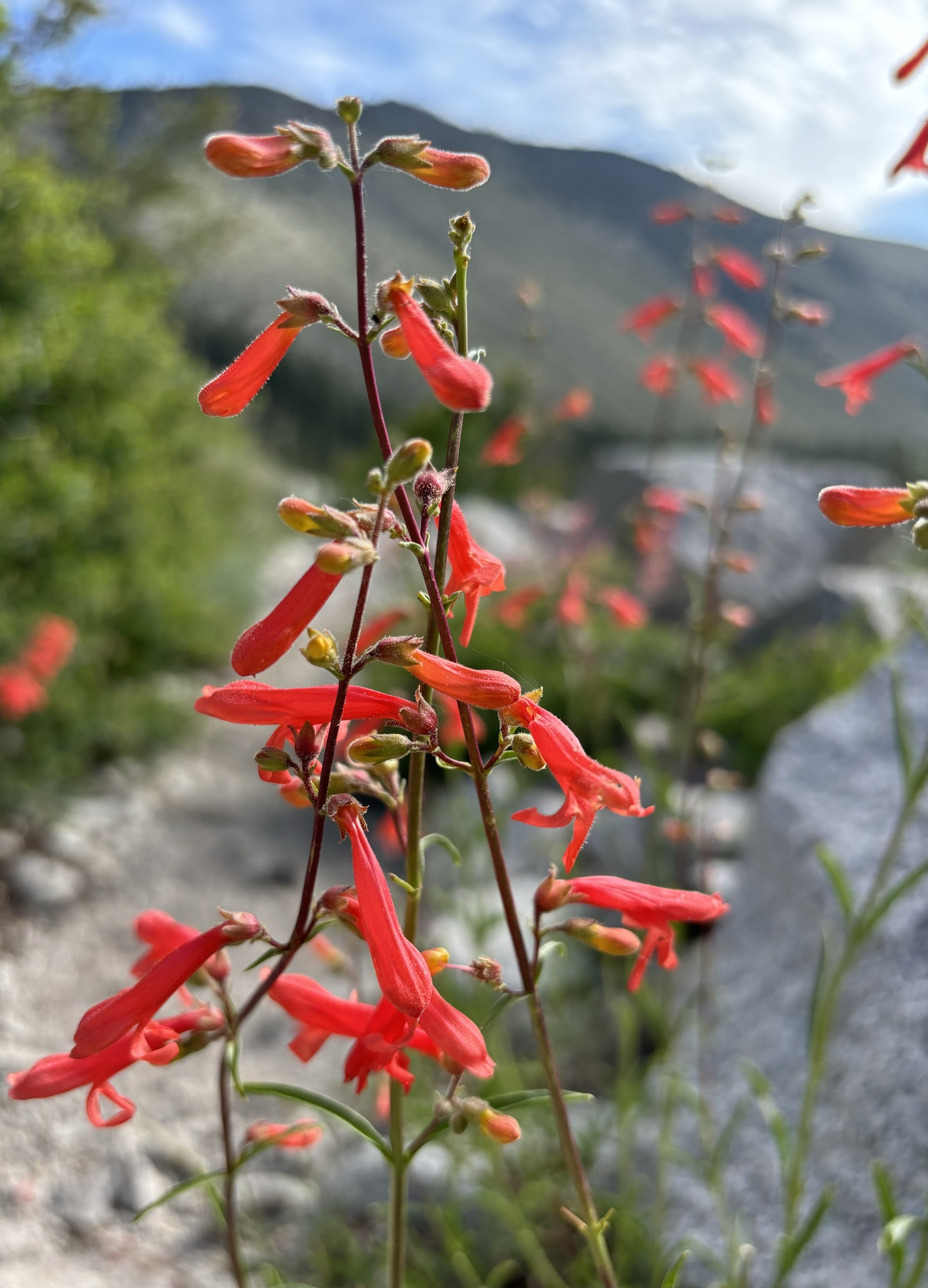
- Inyo National Forest, California

Conservation status
- Apparently Secure (NatureServe)

Scientific classification
- Kingdom: Plantae
- Clade: Tracheophytes
- Clade: Angiosperms
- Clade: Eudicots
- Clade: Asterids
- Order: Lamiales
- Family: Plantaginaceae
- Genus: Penstemon
- Species: P. rostriflorus

Binomial name
- Penstemon rostriflorus Kellogg

Synonyms
- Penstemon bridgesii

= Penstemon rostriflorus =

Plant species in the veronica family

Penstemon rostriflorus is a species of penstemon known as beak-flowered penstemon or beaked penstemon from the southwestern United States and Baja California.

== Description ==
The beak-flowered penstemon resembles a small shrub and has stems that are woody near the base with many leaves. The stems can reach 24 to 100 centimeters (9.5 to 39.5 in), but usually are taller than 30 cm (12 in). The stems can be hairless or vaguely hairy with some plants hairless at near the base and covered in glandular hairs towards the ends.

Almost all its leaves are attached to the stems, though they are more numerous lower down on woody parts of the plant. The few basal leaves and the lower ones on the stems are 2–5.2 cm (0.8–2.0 in) long, but just 3–11 millimeters wide with a widely angled point. They are oblanceolate, like a reversed spear head in shape with the wider portion above the midpoint, and have a tapered base that is almost like a leaf stalk. Higher up on the stems the leaves have the same lower limit but can reach lengths of 7 cm (2.8 in) and are 2–14 mm in width. They are lanceolate, like a spear head with the widest part nearer the base, to nearly like a blade grass with the base of the leaf attached directly to the main stalk.

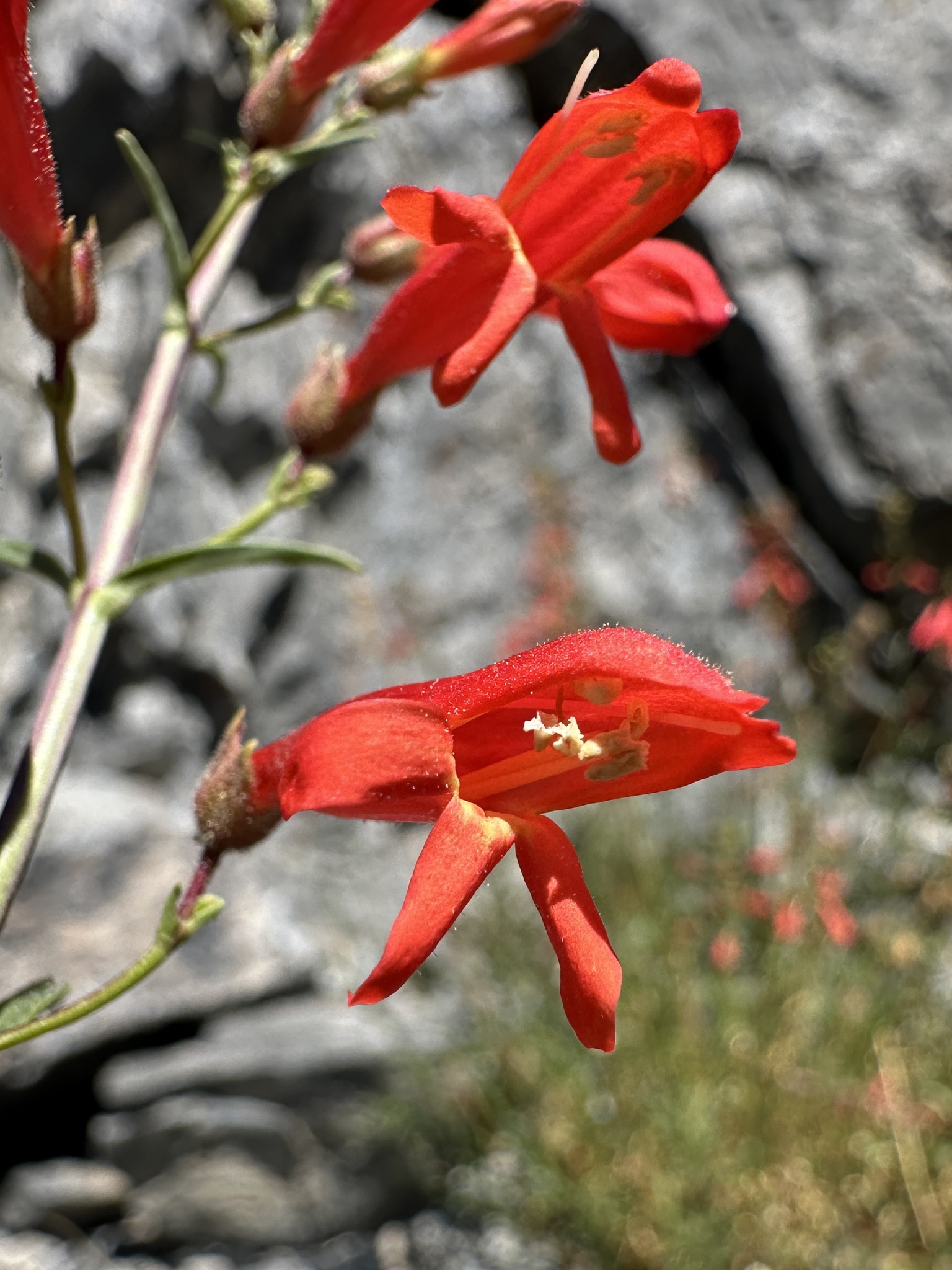
Flowers showing the staminode and stamens extending outwards under the beak

The upper part of its stems is an inflorescence with branches called a thyrse measuring 3–28 cm (1.2–11.0 in), though usually more than 6 cm (2.4 in). It will have three to twelve groups of flowers. Lower down in the inflorescence the flowers are on longer branches with two to five flowers. Higher up flowers become single on shorter branches. Flower buds are green-yellow with red ends. It has bright scarlet flowers with projecting lobes resembling a beak at the top that are notched towards the end. The inside of the flower tube is yellowish or orangish and does not have floral guide lines. They are overall 2.2–3.3 cm long. The staminode is 1.4–1.6 cm long and extends out of the flower's mouth.

The fruit is a capsule measuring 7–10 mm long and 4–5 mm wide.

== Taxonomy ==
Penstemon rostriflorus was scientifically described and named in 1860 by Albert Kellogg. However, the species was usually identified as Penstemon bridgesii in older sources. The fact that Kellogg's name had priority was noticed by Frank Crosswhite and published in the 1984 fourth volume of the Intermountain Flora. It is classified in the genus Penstemon within the family Plantaginaceae. It has no varieties, but has been described as a variety of one of it three synonyms.

Table of Synonyms
Name	Year	Rank	Notes
Penstemon bridgesii A.Gray	1868	species	= het.
Penstemon bridgesii var. amplexicaulis Monnet	1915	variety	= het.
Penstemon bridgesii var. rostriflorus (Kellogg) Schelle	1903	variety	≡ hom., nom. superfl.
Notes: ≡ homotypic synonym ; = heterotypic synonym

=== Names ===
Kellogg named it rostriflorus meaning "beak flower" in Botanical Latin. It is similarly known by the common names beak-flowered penstemon or beaked penstemon. It is also known as beak-flowered beardtongue or beaked beardtongue. Like other red flowered hummingbird adapted penstemons such as Penstemon labrosus it is called scarlet penstemon. Older names still used include bridge penstemon and Bridge's penstemon.

== Range and habitat ==
Beaked penstemon is native to the southwestern United States and Baja California in northwestern Mexico. In Baja California it grows in the Sierra de Juárez range and may also grow in northern Sierra de San Pedro Mártir. They grow on the eastern side of the Sierra Nevada in California and south in the Transverse Ranges, the Peninsular Ranges, and the San Jacinto Mountains. In Nevada and Utah they are found in the southern half of each state and in the northern part of Arizona. In New Mexico it is recorded in just two widely separated western counties, San Juan and Catron, but in Colorado the species is known in the three southwestern counties; Dolores, Montezuma, and La Plata. It can be found at elevations of 1,200 to 3,200 meters (3,900–10,500 ft).

It grows in association with sagebrush steppes, pinyon–juniper woodlands, Gamble oak scrublands, ponderosa pine forests, and mountain mahogany shrublands. It is associated with sandstone outcrops and dry, sandy or rocky soils. In Baja California it almost always grows in partial shade on wooded slopes and at the edges of meadows.

== Cultivation ==
The beaked penstemon has a long history of cultivation and is valued by gardeners for its moderate size being significantly shorter than the red flowered golden-beard penstemon (Penstemon barbatus) and for its long flowering period, from early to late Summer. It is tolerant of a wide range of soils including clay, loam, and sandy and is hardy in USDA Zones 4b–8. It is grown from seeds, which require a 45-day cold-moist stratification. In garden conditions it is a long-lived plant.
