= Trail Mountain Fire =

2018 wildfire in Utah, United States

- Part of the 2018 Utah wildfires
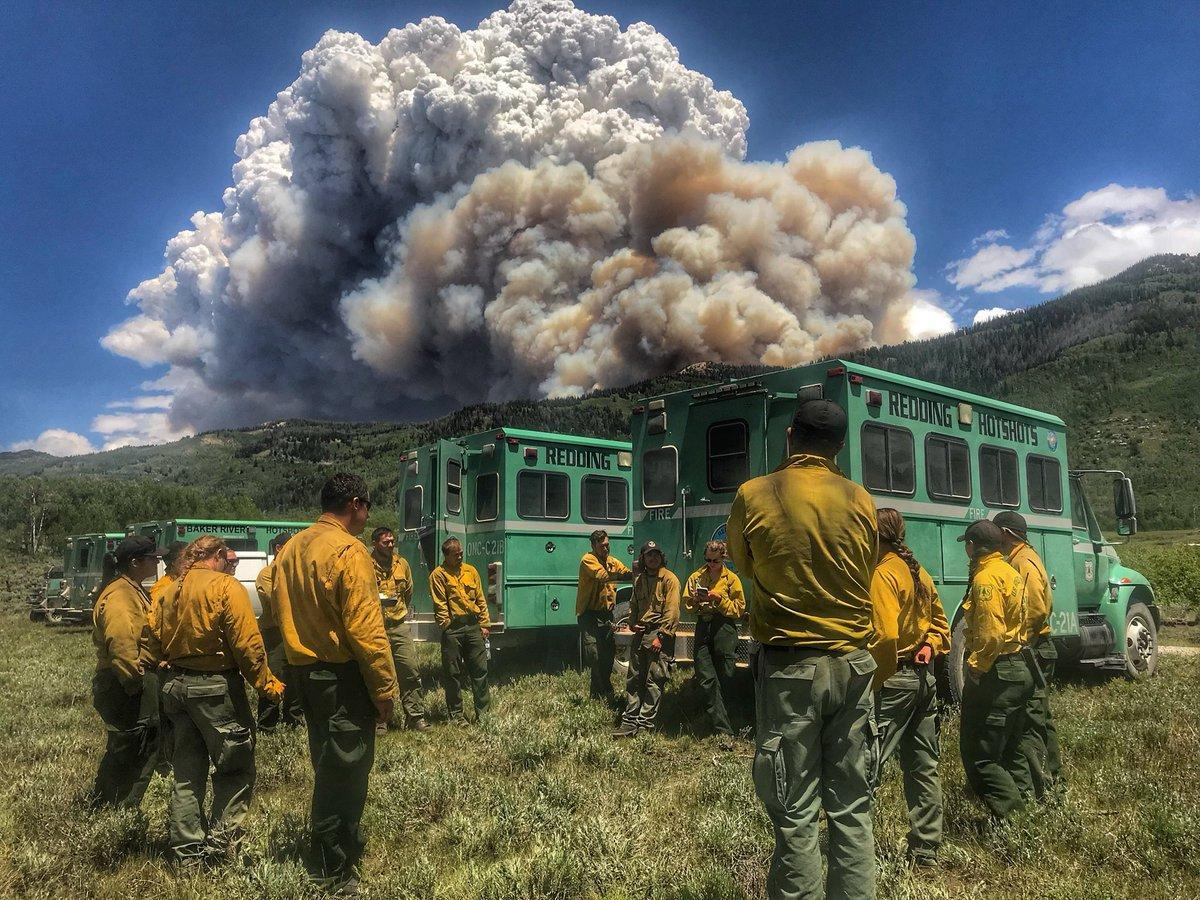
- Date: June 6, 2018 – June 27, 2018
- Location: Manti-La Sal National Forest, Utah, United States
- Coordinates: 39.358°N 111.216°W

Statistics
- Burned area: 18,011 acres (73 km^{2})
- Land use: National forest

Impacts
- Structures destroyed: 1

Ignition
- Cause: Escaped prescribed fire due to high winds

Map
- Location of fire in Utah

The Trail Mountain Fire was a wildfire burning in Manti-La Sal National Forest fifteen miles northwest of Orangeville, Utah in the United States. The fire was started on June 6, 2018, after the Trail Mountain prescribed burn escaped due to high winds.

== Incidents ==
The Trail Mountain Fire began when the Trail Mountain prescribed burn escaped across Cottonwood Canyon Road to East Mountain on June 6, 2018, burning 300 acres (1 km^{2}). By June 10, high wind gusts of 55 miles per hour caused the fire to grow into Meetinghouse Canyon. The heavy winds caused all air support fighting the fire to be grounded. One cabin in the Whetstone Creek area was burned. A temporary flight restriction was put in place for the area. Indian Creek Campground was closed.

By June 12, heavy smoke had permeated the area. The fire had expanded north into Deer Creek Canyon, Rilda Canyon and the plateaus above Mill Fork Canyon, which all feed into Huntington Canyon. The next day, Highway 31 was closed and areas of Huntington Canyon were closed and select campgrounds were evacuated. On June 14, the highway and Huntington Canyon reopened. However, the next day, June 15, Highway 31 was closed once again due to fire activity and heavy use of the highway by fire crews. By the end of the day, the fire had grown 3,000 acres (12 km^{2}) to 13,710 acres (55 km^{2}) and was ten percent contained.

Officials re-opened Highway 31 through Huntington Canyon on June 16. The fire had minimal activity due to high humidity and cloud cover. The northern part of the fire remained uncontained while crews focused on scattering cut vegetation, stabilizing soils, installing water bars to manage water and sediment, and removing hazardous, fire-weakened trees along roads in contained areas.

By June 22, Red Flag Warnings impacted the fire, pushing it into Crandall Canyon and keeping it active in Little Bear Canyon. The fire did not impact the Crandall Canyon Mine and memorial.

By June 27, the fire had burnt 17,767 acres (72 km^{2}) and was 80 percent contained. It was fueled by mixed conifer and dead and down timber. The fire was 90% contained by the middle of July and was the last update due to no growth and extinguishment of the entire perimeter.
