= 2018 Utah wildfires =

Series of fires in Utah, United States

- Date: June, 2018 – October, 2018

The 2018 wildfire season in Utah began around June, 2018.

== List of fires ==
Fires included:

- Trail Mountain Fire (June 6–June 27)
- West Valley Fire (June 27–August 7)
- Dollar Ridge Fire (July 1–October)
- Echo Canyon Fire
- Pole Creek Fire (September 6–October 6).

== Legal case ==
A homeowner sued the United States Forest Service for not putting out the Pole Creek Fire, as well as the Bald Mountain Fire, which merged with it; a Federal judge threw out the lawsuit in 2023.
