= Pine Valley Mountain Wilderness =

Wilderness area in Utah, United States

- IUCN category Ib (wilderness area)
- Location within the United States
- Location: Washington County, Utah, U.S.
- Nearest city: Veyo, UT
- Coordinates: 37°21′59″N 113°24′53″W
- Area: 50,232 acres (203.28 km^{2})
- Established: 1984
- Governing body: U.S. Forest Service

Pine Valley Mountain Wilderness is a 50,232-acre (203.28 km^{2}) wilderness area located in the Dixie National Forest in the U.S. state of Utah. It is the fourth-largest wilderness area located entirely within the state (following the High Uintas Wilderness, Zion Wilderness, and Cedar Mountain Wilderness). The wilderness designation protects the Pine Valley Mountain range, a large rock outcrop surrounded by desert. The Pine Valley Mountains form the Pine Valley Laccolith, one of the largest laccoliths in the United States. Elevations in the wilderness range from 6,000 feet (1,800 m) to 10,365 feet (3,159 m) at the summit of Signal Peak.

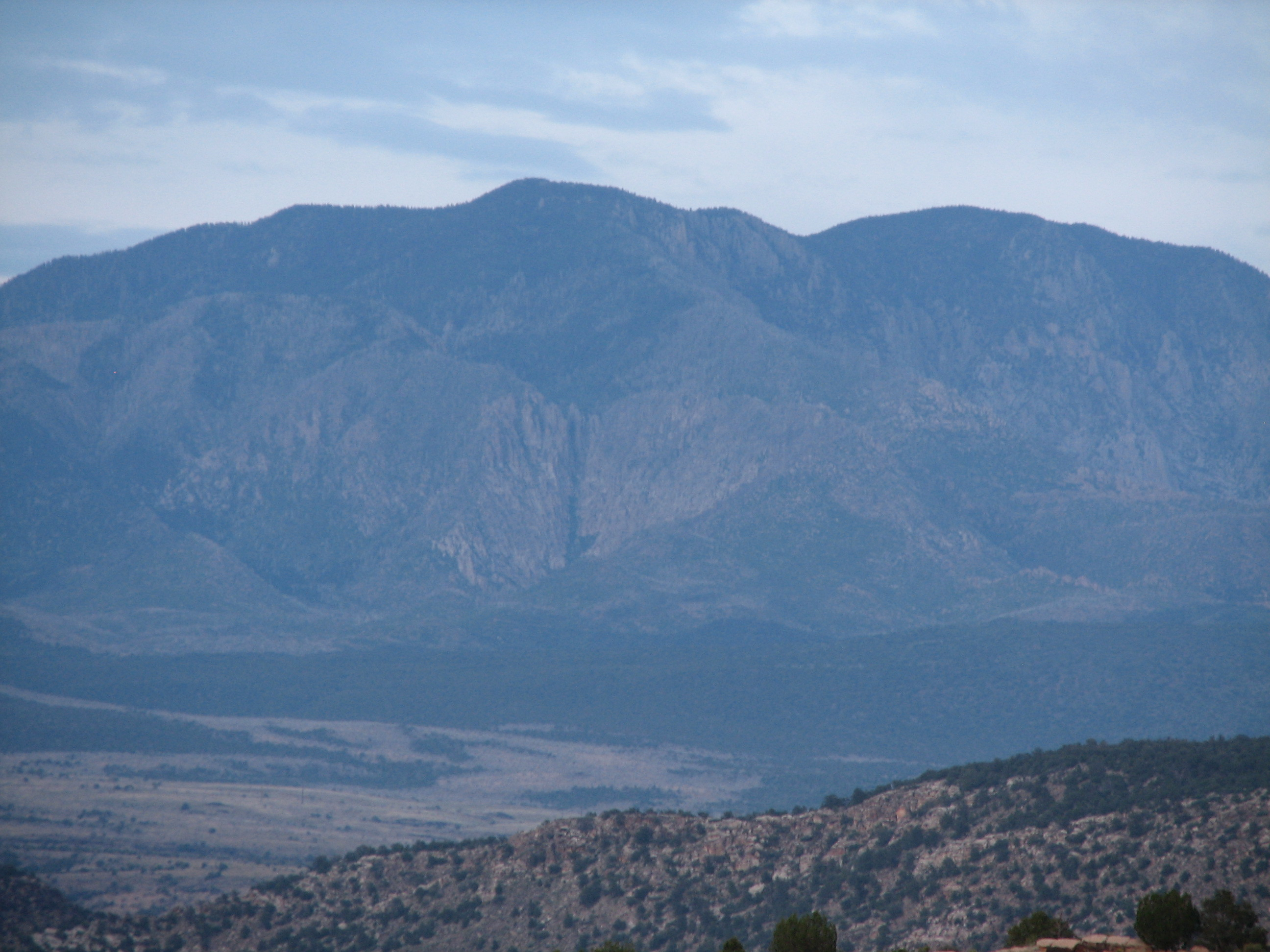
Pine Valley Mountains from the Red Mountain Wilderness Study Area

== Vegetation ==
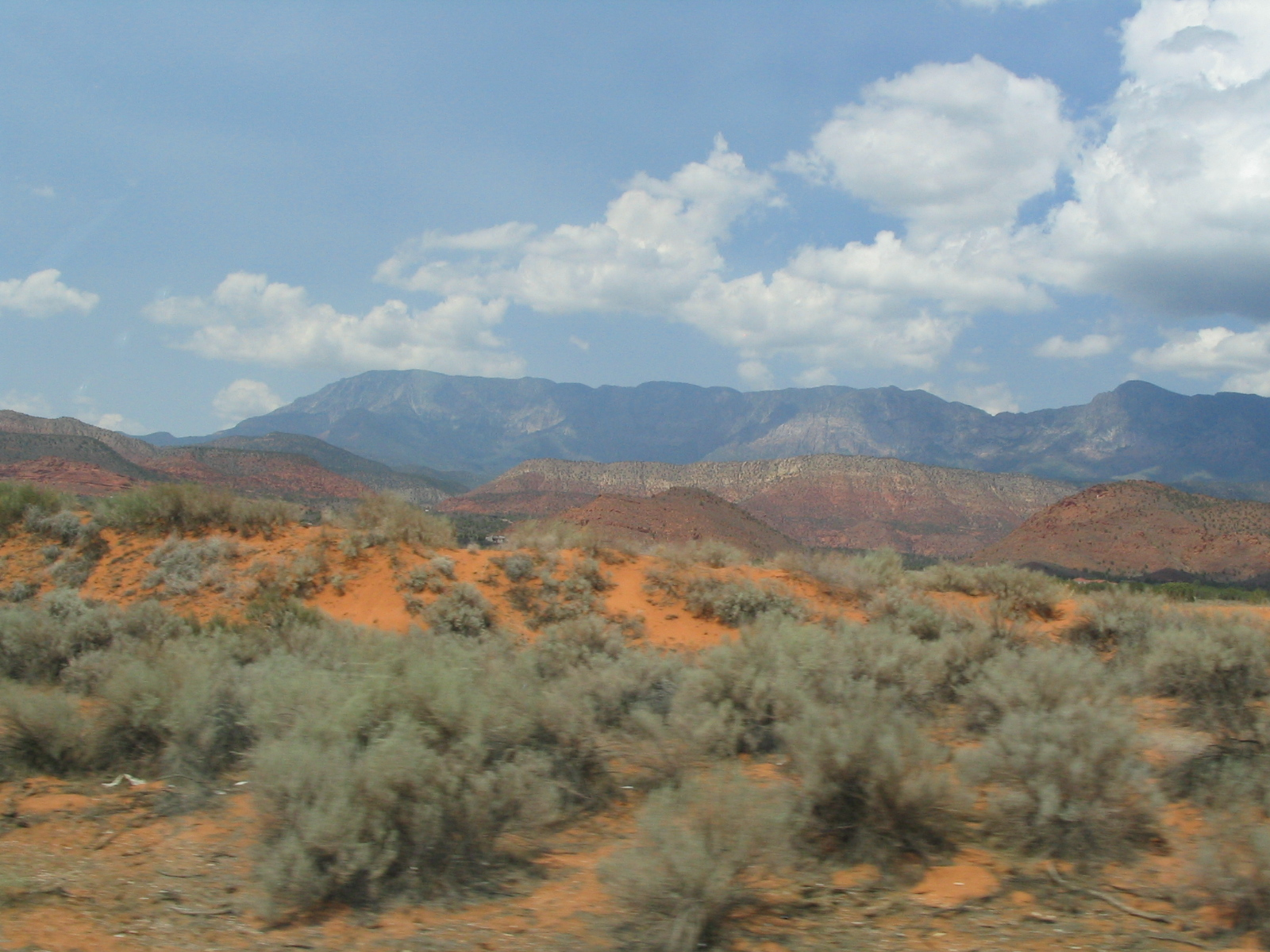
Pine Valley Mountains from Interstate 15

The southern half of the Pine Valley Mountain Wilderness area supports a large stand of virgin Engelmann spruce. On the south edge of this unit, young stands of bristlecone pine are also found. The north half of the area is composed of stands of mixed spruce, subalpine fir, Douglas fir, and limber pine. Stands of large aspen are also found throughout the area.

There are numerous meadows up to 50 acres (0.20 km^{2}) in size within the boundaries of the Wilderness. The predominant vegetation is mat muhly, subalpine needlegrass, alpine timothy, dandelion, Perry clover, shrubby cinquifoil, yarrow, fleabane, snowberry, and serviceberry.

== Wildlife ==
The Pine Valley Mountains is more or less isolated from the Wasatch Range. Because of this isolation there are a number of sub-species of mammals found here, including the Uinta chipmunk, yellow-bellied marmot, and red squirrel. There are numerous dusky grouse and herds of deer within the meadows and timber. Brown bear roamed the Pine Valley Mountains as late as 1914.

=== Utah sensitive species ===
A variety of Utah sensitive species live in the Pine Valley Mountain Wilderness area.

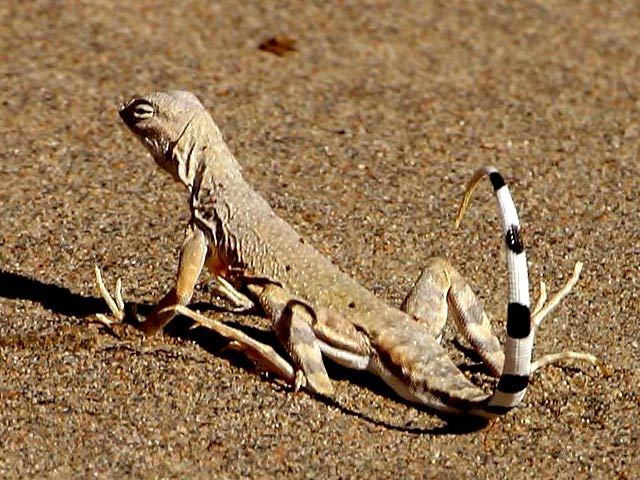
Zebra-tailed lizard (Callisaurus draconoides)

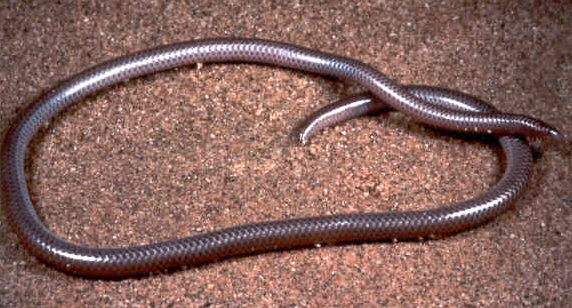
Western threadsnake (Leptotyphlops humilis)

- Bonneville cutthroat trout (Oncorhynchus clarki utah)
- Townsend's big-eared bat (Corynorhinus townsendii)
- Pygmy rabbit (Brachylagus idahoensis)
- Arizona toad (Bufo microscaphus)
- Northern goshawk (Accipiter gentilis)
- Desert sucker (Catostomus clarki)
- Western toad (Bufo boreas)
- Fringed myotis (Myotis thysanodes)
- Arizona toad (Bufo microscaphus)
- Greater sage-grouse (Centrocercus urophasianu) (ESA candidate species)
- Ferruginous hawk (Buteo regalis)
- Burrowing owl (Athene cunicularia)
- Long-billed curlew (Numenius americanus)
- Bald eagle (Haliaeetus leucocephalus)
- Virgin spinedace (Lepidomeda mollispinis)
- Zebra-tailed lizard (Callisaurus draconoides)
- Common chuckwalla (Sauromalus ater)
- Flannelmouth sucker (Catostomus latipinnis)
- Relict leopard frog (Rana onca) (extirpated) (ESA candidate species)
- Western banded gecko (Coleonyx variegatus)
- Desert night lizard (Xantusia vigilis)
- Western threadsnake (Rena humilis)

== Recreation ==
Common recreational activities in Pine Valley Mountain Wilderness include hiking, camping, horseback riding, and wildlife watching. There is a network of over 151 miles (243 km) of trails on and around the Wilderness, including the popular Summit and Whipple Trails.

== See also ==
- Pine Valley Mountains
- Dixie National Forest
- Wilderness Act
- National Wilderness Preservation System
- List of U.S. Wilderness Areas
