= Red Cliffs National Conservation Area =

Conservation area in Utah, United States

- Red Cliffs Desert Reserve
- IUCN category V (protected landscape/seascape)
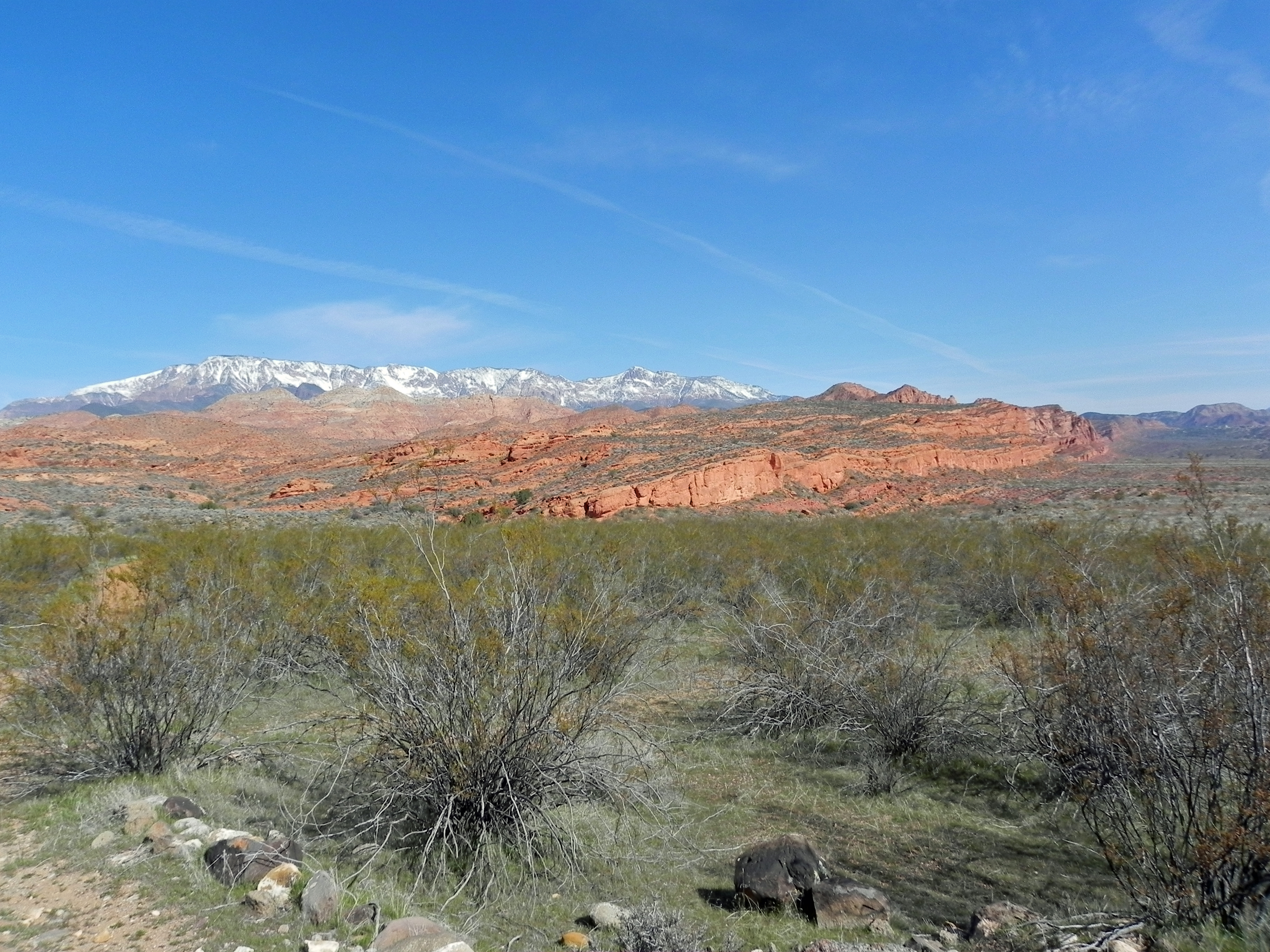
- Red Cliffs National Conservation Area

- Location within the United States
- Location: Washington County, Utah, United States
- Nearest city: St. George, Utah
- Coordinates: 37°09′22″N 113°33′14″W
- Area: 44,725 acres (181.00 km^{2})
- Established: 2009
- Governing body: Bureau of Land Management
- Website: Official website

The Red Cliffs National Conservation Area is a 44,724-acre (180.99 km^{2}) National Conservation Area located in southwest Utah, north of St. George at the northeasternmost edge of the Mojave Desert. It is managed by the Bureau of Land Management as part of the National Landscape Conservation System, and was created as part of the Omnibus Public Land Management Act of 2009.

The Red Cliffs National Conservation Area (NCA) is part of the larger multi-jurisdictional Red Cliffs Desert Reserve, which was created in 1996 to protect the habitat and populations of the desert tortoise and other species. Part of the NCA was designated in 2009 as the Cottonwood Canyon and Red Mountain wilderness areas, which are part of the National Wilderness Preservation System.

The Pine Valley Mountains and Dixie National Forest are north of the NCA. The NCA is located within the watershed of the Virgin River, a tributary of the Colorado River. There are over 130 miles (210 km) of non-motorized trails in the NCA.

== Gallery ==
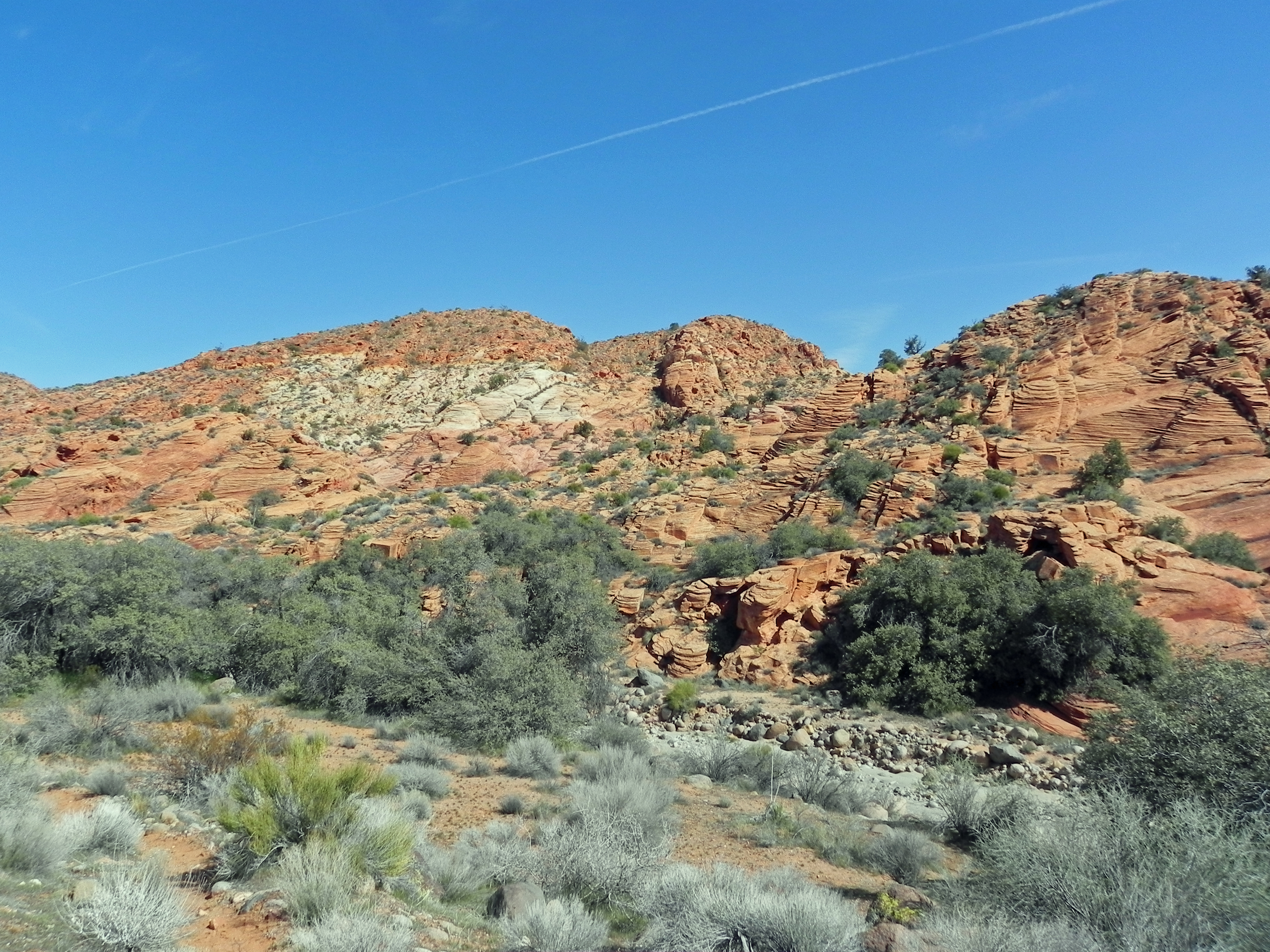
Cottonwood Canyon

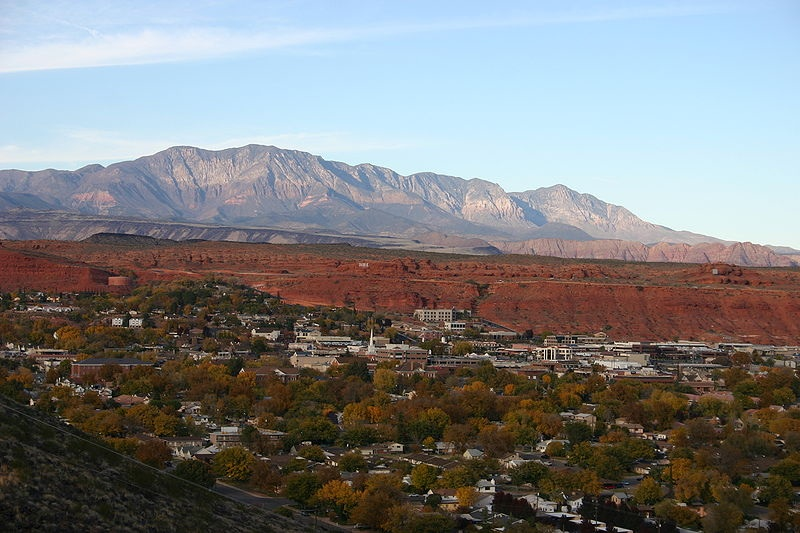
St. George and the Red Cliffs

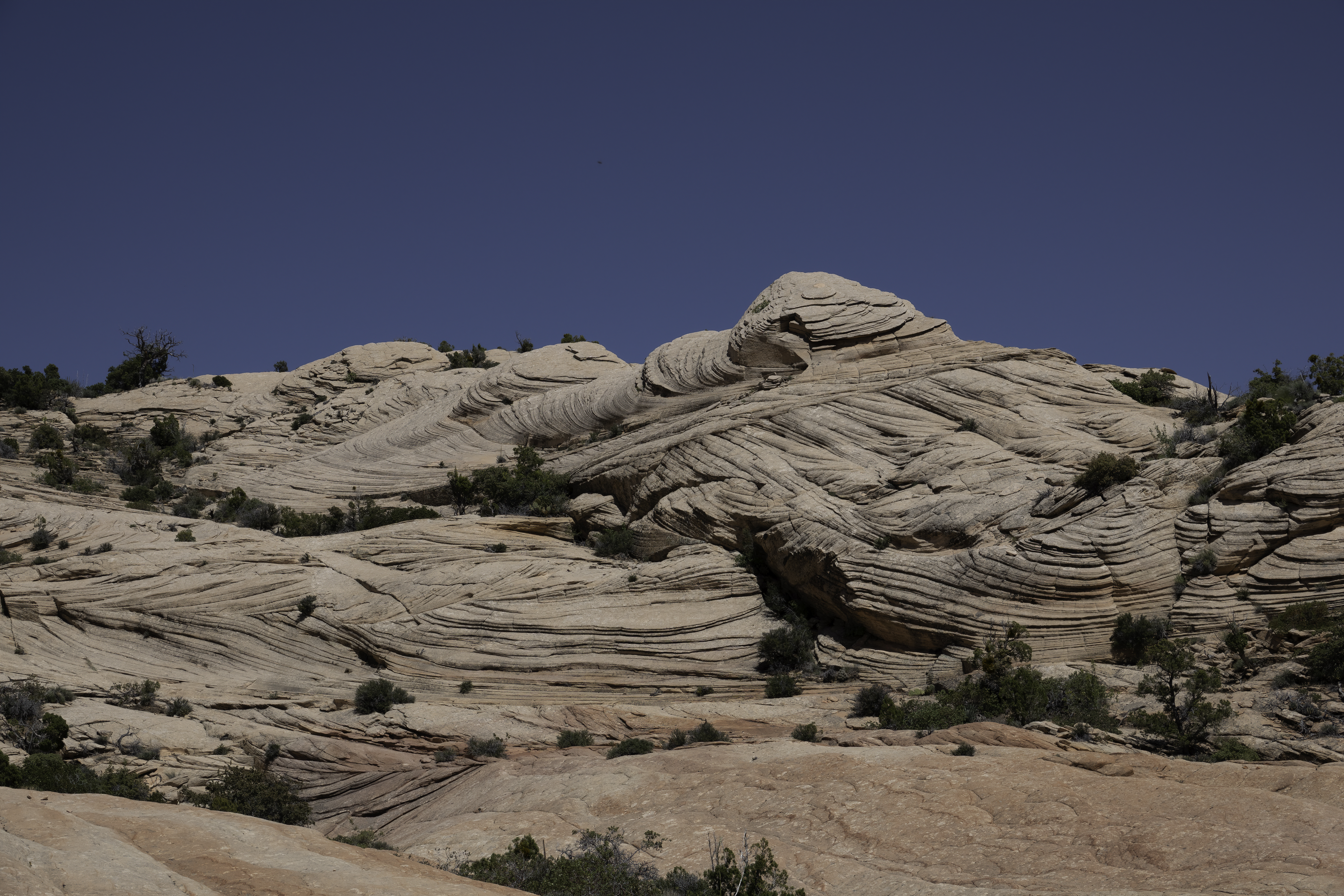
Top of Yant Flat trail: spectacular cross-bedding in fossil sand dunes in the Navajo sandstone

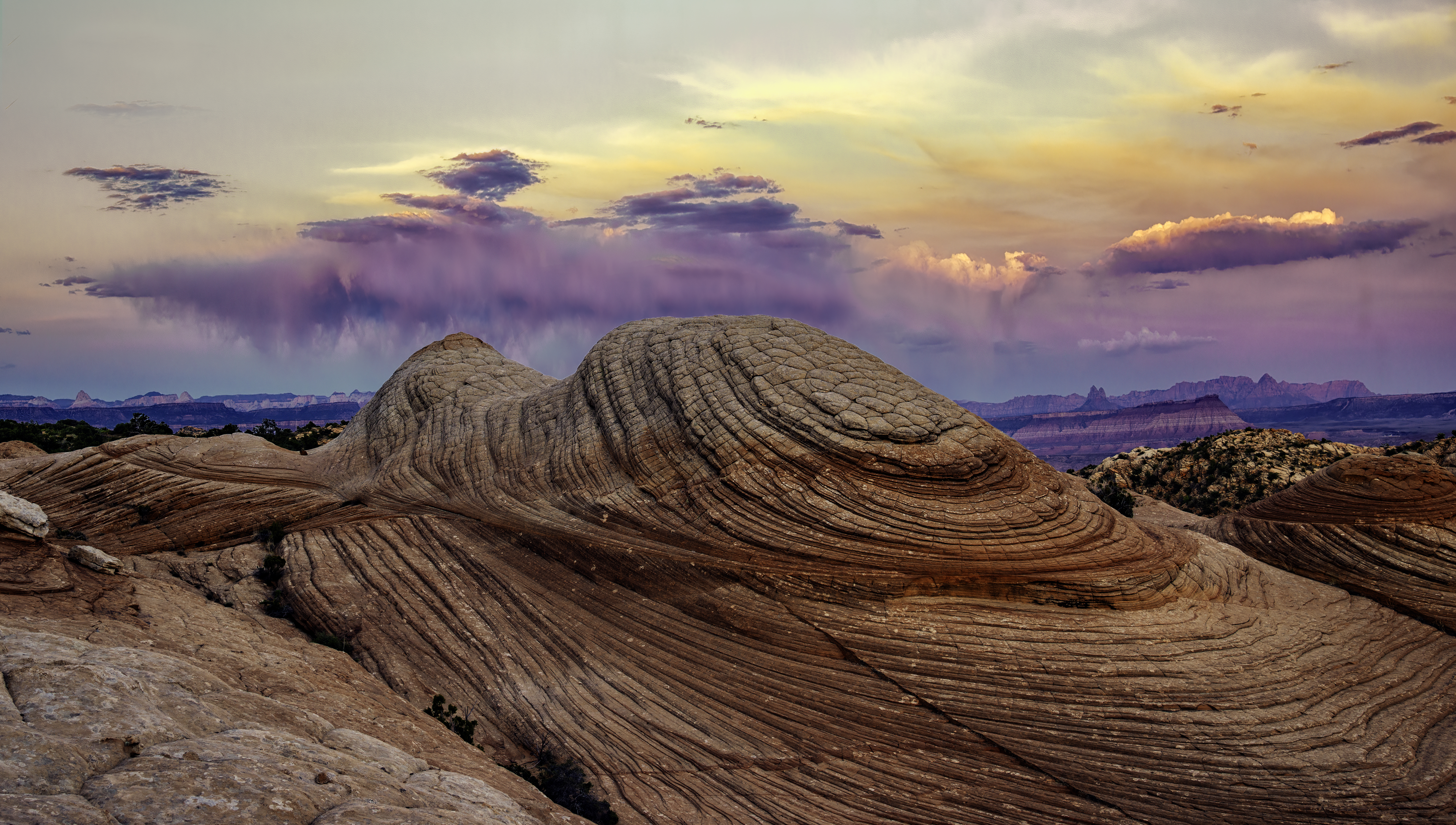
More geology and scenery along the Yant Flat trail, Red Cliffs NCA
