= Pine Valley Mountains =

Mountain range in Utah, United States

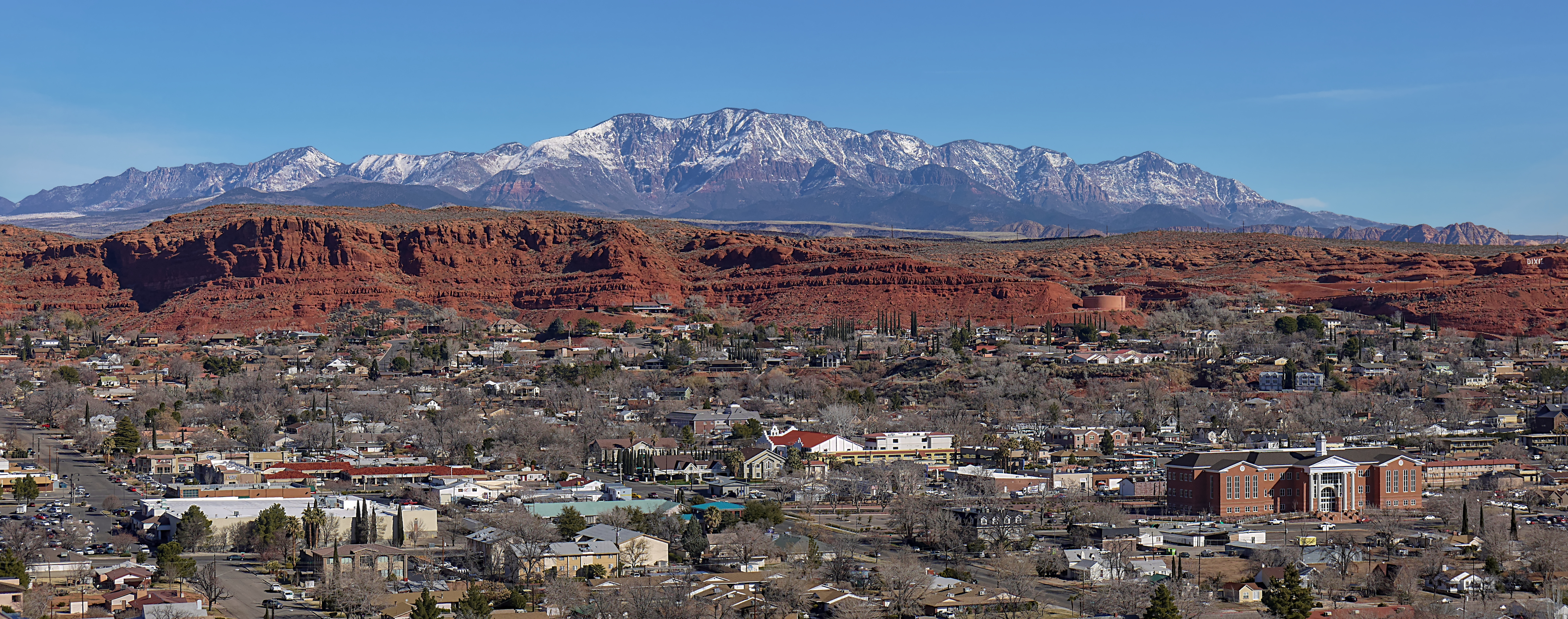
- Pine Valley Mountains and St. George

Highest point
- Peak: Signal Peak
- Elevation: 10,365 ft (3,159 m)
- Coordinates: 37°19′11″N 113°29′30″W

Dimensions
- Length: 35 mi (56 km) N/S
- Width: 28 mi (45 km) E/W
- Area: 591 mi^{2} (1,530 km^{2})

Geography
- Location within Utah
- Country: United States
- State: Utah

The Pine Valley Mountains are a mountain range in Washington County, Utah, United States, spanning the county north of the city of St. George. The highest point in the range is Signal Peak at 10,365 feet (3,159 m). The mountains are part of Dixie National Forest and are bordered to the south by the Red Cliffs National Conservation Area.

== Geology ==
The Pine Valley Mountains formed from the Pine Valley Laccolith, the largest laccolith in the United States and perhaps the world. The laccolith was formed during a 20-million-year period of volcanic activity. After 4,000–5,000 feet (1,200–1,500 m) of volcanic rock was deposited on the Claron Formation, the magma vents were effectively sealed off. A final surge of magma, unable to find its way to the surface, pushed sideways along the weak seam between the Claron and overlying volcanic layers. This injected a 3,000-foot-thick (910 m) layer of monzonite porphyry to form the Pine Valley laccolith. The contact between the top of the Claron and the bottom of the laccolith can be seen in several locations, most notably near the headwaters of Cottonwood Creek along the southwest corner of the mountain range (see photo below in the gallery), and at the headwaters of Leap Creek north of the Browse Guard Station.

After erosion exposed the laccolith, volcanic activity continued and the youngest flows are 1–1.6 million years old. Many volcanic cinder cones can still be seen in the foothills of the Pine Valley Mountains, and these have been dated at around 20,000 years old. As a result of these lava flows, the valley for which the mountain range is named and in which the town of Pine Valley is situated, was formed when lava dammed off the Santa Clara River and formed a lake. Sediments eventually filled the lake until they reached the height of the lava dam. These sediments form the floor of the present-day Pine Valley, Grass Valley, and Grassy Flat.

The mountains straddle the divide between the Great Basin watershed and the watershed of the Virgin River, a tributary of the Colorado River. The Chinamen's Canal tunnel at the north end of Grass Valley diverts the waters of Mill Canyon Creek from the Colorado River drainage system into the Great Basin drainage system, eventually finding its way into the Newcastle Reservoir via Pinto Creek. Zion National Park can be seen to the east from the mountains.

== Wilderness ==
Part of the range is in the Pine Valley Mountain Wilderness, which at 50,232 acres (20,328 ha) is the fourth-largest wilderness in Utah. The 2,643-acre (1,070 ha) Cottonwood Forest Wilderness is located at the southeastern end of the range.

== Flora and fauna ==
The Pine Valley Mountains support spruce-fir forests, including a large stand of virgin Engelmann spruce. The mountains also have numerous meadows up to 50 acres (20 ha) in size. Several threatened, endangered, and sensitive species live in the mountains, including Bonneville cutthroat trout, Townsend's big-eared bat, and the pygmy rabbit, among others.

Botanically speaking, the Pine Valley Mountains is the most diverse mountain range in Utah. A floristic survey was conducted between 1985 and 1987, and 967 species were collected. Since then, additional species have been added, bringing the total to nearly 1,000. Three species new to Utah were identified including bitter cherry (Prunus emarginata (Dougl.) Walpers), common sandweed (Athysanus pusillus (Hook.) Greene), and Lemmon's onion (Allium lemmonii S. Wats.). Nineteen ferns and fern allies are present, 18 gymnosperms (conifers and Mormon teas), 150 species of monocots (including 86 grasses, 10 orchids, and 2 agaves, among others), with the remainder being dicots. The three largest families represented in the flora of the Pine Valley Mountains include the Asteraceae with 160 species, Poaceae with 85 species, and Fabaceae with 63. The three largest genera and number of species collected are Eriogonum (23), Cryptantha (20), and Astragalus (20). Some of the finds include:

- Forked spleenwort (Asplenium septentrionale (L.) Hoffm.), a small grass-like fern found at a single high-elevation location north of Mill Flat.
- Grape fern (Botrychium) found in the high meadows.
- Young bristlecone pines (Pinus longaeva D.K. Bailey) are found along the very crest of the mountain especially near the summit of the Oak Grove trail and westward.
- Sequoia tree (Sequoiadendron giganteum (Lindl.) Buchholz). A single tree planted behind the Browse guard station is almost four feet in diameter.
- Pistachios have escaped cultivation from old plantings near Leeds and Harrisburg. The rootstocks for those orchards were the Mount Atlas pistachio (Pistacia atlantica Desf.) while the upper portions of the trees were the edible pistachio (Pistacia vera L.). Some of the tops have died and trees have resprouted from the rootstocks and produced viable seeds. Birds have helped move them into the southern foothills of Pine Valley Mountain where they have become naturalized, often growing as bonsai trees out of cracks in rocks and cliffs.
- Dollarjoint cactus (Opuntia chlorotica Engelm. & Bigel.) scattered along the southern foothills.
- A yellow-flowered population of Bridges penstemon (Penstemon rostriflorus Kellogg), along the south fork of Pinto Creek.
- Three species of orchids in the genus Corallorhiza.
- Pine Valley goldenbush (Ericameria crispus (L.C. Anderson) G.L. Nesom), with its peculiar crinkled leaves, is only found in the Pine Valley Mountains, most commonly along the Whipple Trail in Hop Canyon.
- Utah spikemoss (Selaginella utahensis Flowers) has an extremely limited distribution in southwestern Utah and one location in Nevada, but is locally common on Pine Valley Mountain wherever a shady spot and Navajo sandstone can be found together.

All but one of Utah's conifers grow in the Pine Valley Mountains; only the lodgepole pine (Pinus contorta Douglas) is missing.

== Recreation ==
There are numerous opportunities for recreation in the mountains, including hiking, rock climbing, camping, wildlife watching, fishing, hunting, horseback riding, and boating on a reservoir.

== Peaks ==
Incomplete list of peaks of the Pine Valley Mountains
Mountain Peak	Elevation	Prominence	Isolation	Location
Signal Peak	10,367 ft 3160 m	4,485 ft 1367 m	41.2 mi 66.3 km	37.319537°N 113.492205°W
Burger Peak	10,322 ft 3146 m	282 ft 86 m	0.64 mi 1.03 km	37.325469°N 113.501154°W
Big Point	10,023 ft 3055 m	1,004 ft 306 m	6.44 mi 10.36 km	37.4141°N 113.3809°W
Gardner Peak	9,488 ft 2892 m	207 ft 63 m	5.29 mi 8.52 km	37.391335°N 113.451708°W
Timber Mountain	9,022 ft 2750 m	522 ft 159 m	3.83 mi 6.16 km	37.4708°N 113.3961°W
Mount Baldy	8,894 ft 2711 m	354 ft 108 m	1.81 mi 2.91 km	37.4314°N 113.3364°W
Rencher Peak	8,789 ft 2679 m	768 ft 234 m	2.46 mi 3.96 km	37.5016°N 113.4114°W
Snow Benchmark	5,571 ft 1698 m	unknown	11.24 mi 18.09 km	37.251581°N 113.682986°W
Veyo Volcano	5,240 ft 1597 m	600 ft 183 m	4.52 mi 7.28 km	37.316301°N 113.696358°W
Leeds Benchmark	5,174 ft 1577 m	unknown	6.71 mi 10.8 km	37.257363°N 113.398505°W
Cottonwood Canyon Wilderness HP	5,016 ft 1529 m	unknown	6.75 mi 10.86 km	37.225799°N 113.527169°W
Cinder Cone	4,839 ft 1475 m	unknown	3.17 mi 5.1 km	37.256669°N 113.625884°W

== Gallery ==
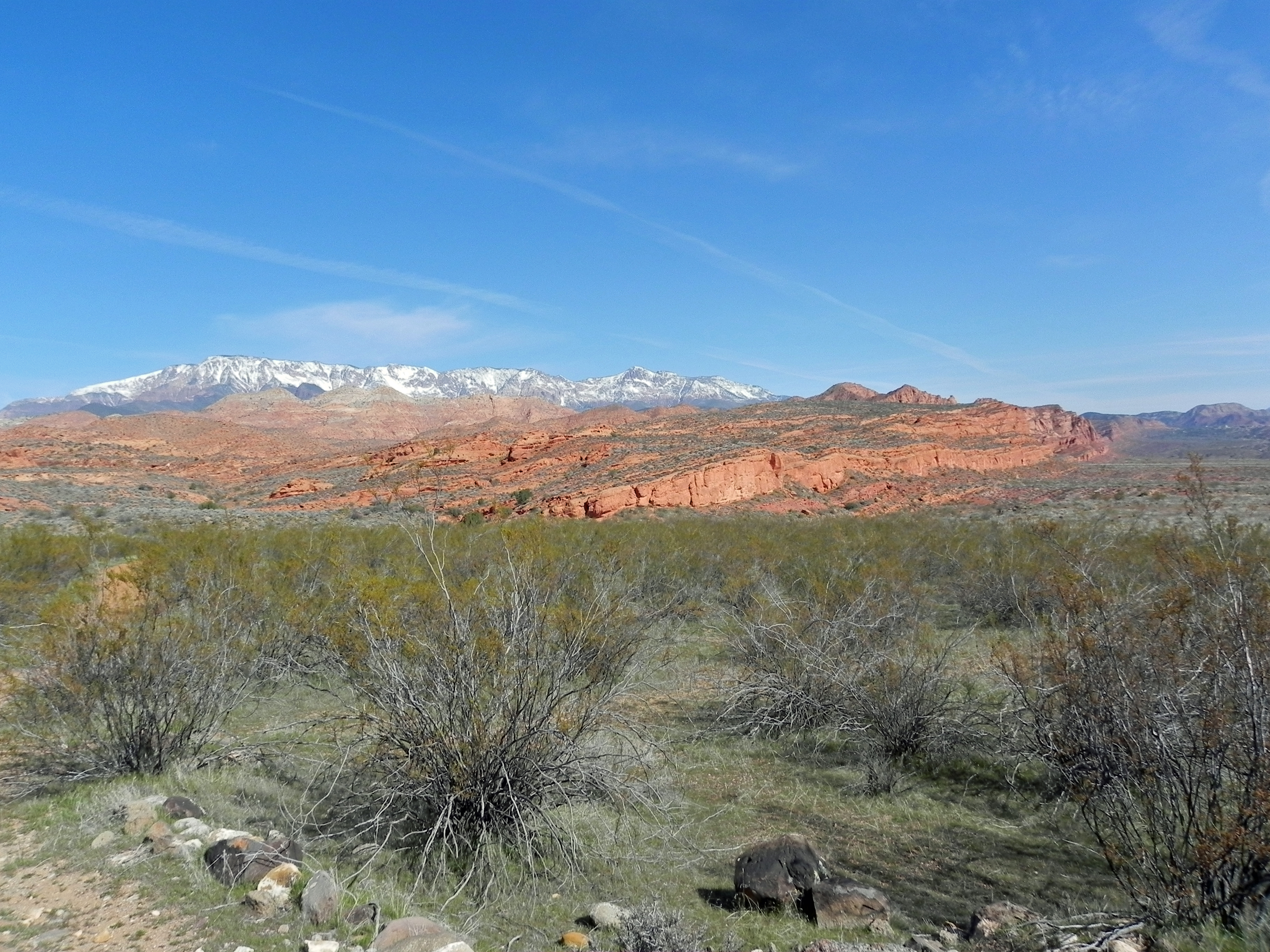
Pine Valley Mountains

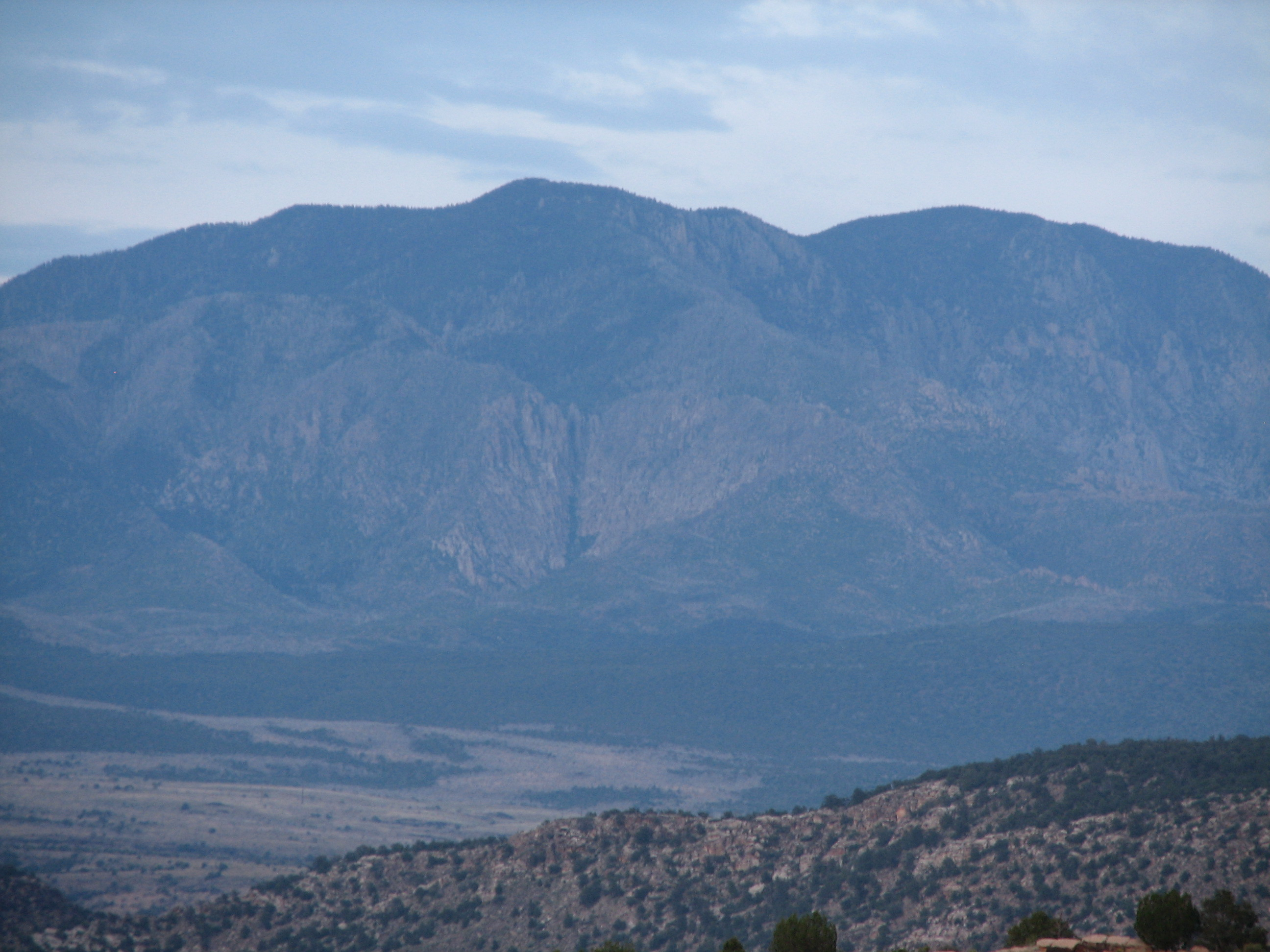
Pine Valley Mountain from Lower Sand Cove

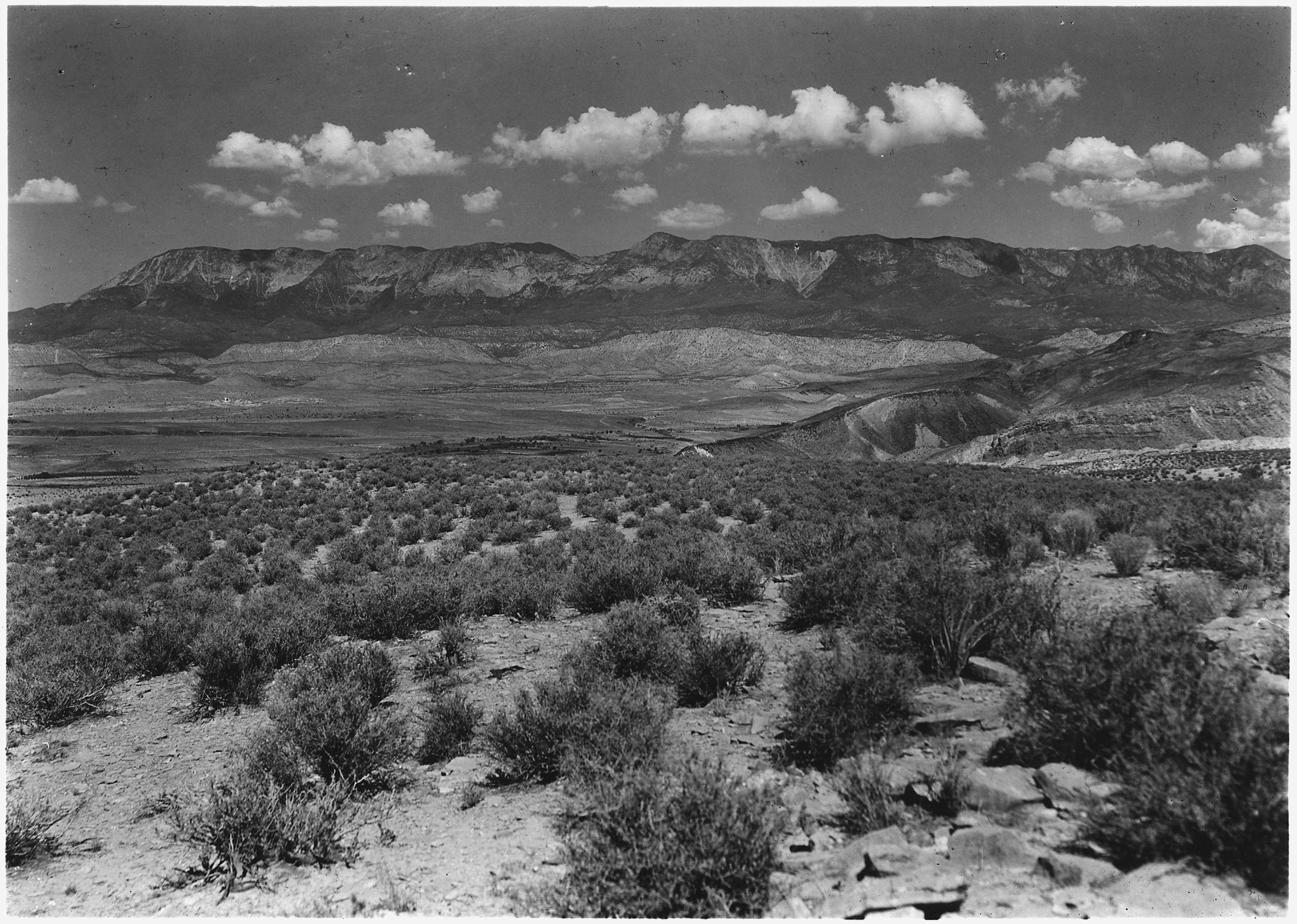
Pine Valley Mountains

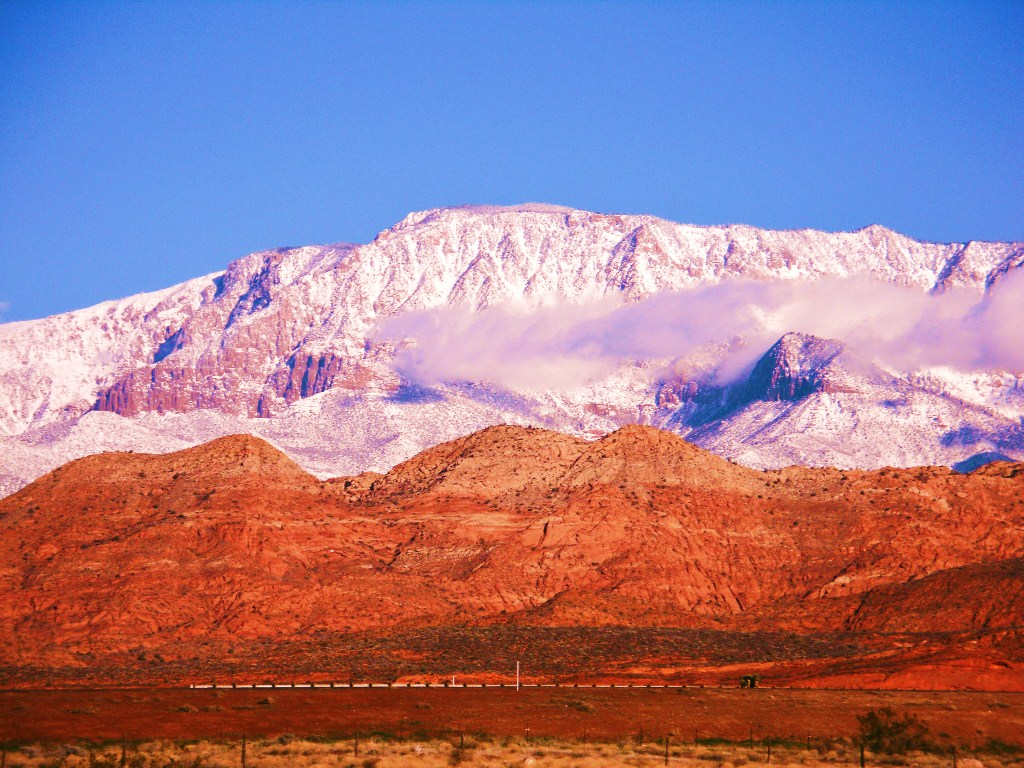
Sunrise on Pine Valley Mountain and Red Cliffs National Conservation Area, Utah

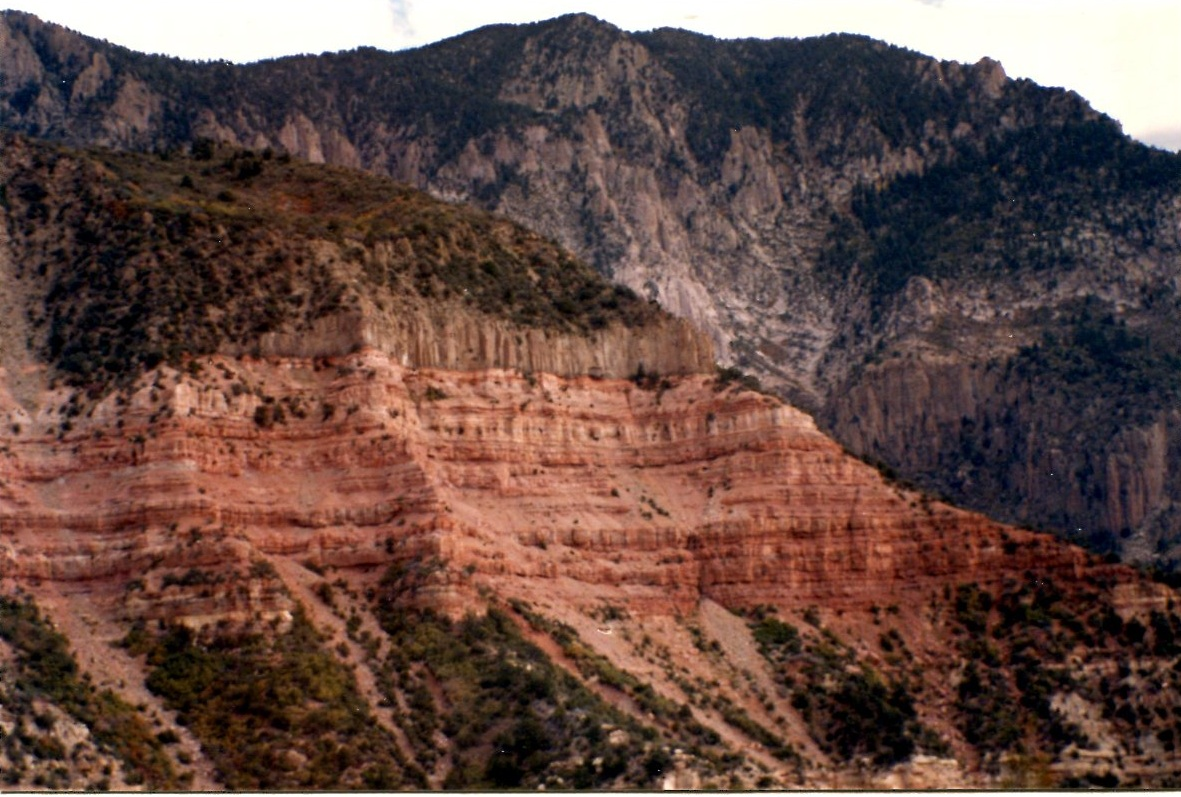
Pine Valley Laccolith resting on top of the Claron Formation near the headwaters of Cottonwood Creek

== See also ==
- Pine Valley Mountain Wilderness
- Dixie National Forest
