= West Valley Fire =

2018 wildfire in Utah, United States

- Part of the 2018 Utah wildfires
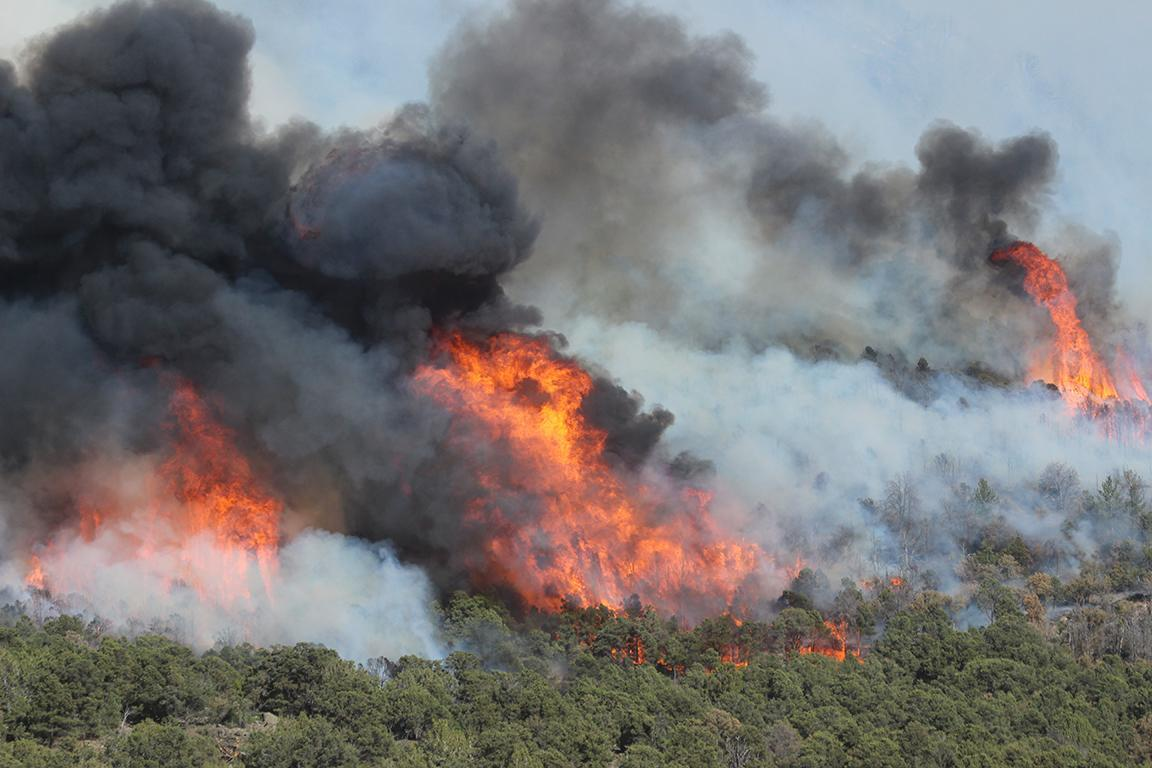
- West Valley Fire on July 4, 2018
- Date: June 27, 2018 – August 7, 2018
- Location: Dixie National Forest, Utah, United States
- Coordinates: 37.397°N 113.423°W

Statistics
- Burned area: 11,771 acres (48 km^{2})
- Land use: National forest

Ignition
- Cause: Abandoned campfire

Map
- Location of fire in Utah

Location of West Valley Fire

The West Valley Fire was a wildfire in Dixie National Forest, approximately ten miles north of St. George, Utah in the United States. The fire was started by an abandoned campfire and was first reported on June 27 and reported contained by August 7. The fire burned a total of 11,771 acres (48 km^{2}).

== Events ==
=== June ===
The West Valley Fire was reported on June 27 at approximately 3:00 PM burning in the Dixie National Forest, 10 miles north of St. George, Utah. The fire was started by an abandoned campfire. By June 29, the fire had grown 7,200 acres (29 km^{2}), burning into the Mill Flat Fire scar from 2006, slowing the fire's progression north-northeast. Dixie National Forest was temporarily closed in select areas.

=== July ===
Red flag warnings caused an increase in fire activity at the beginning of July. By July 10, the fire had grown to 11,771 acres (48 km^{2}) and was 55 percent contained. Additional areas of the national forest were closed along the West Valley Fire perimeter and in the Pine Valley Ranger District. On July 11, Burned Area Emergency Response began investigation regarding post-fire rehabilitation. As of July 27, the fire had burned a total of 11,771 acres (48 km^{2}) and was 55 percent contained.

== August ==
The fire was reported contained by August 7.
