= Red Mountain Wilderness (Utah) =

Wilderness area in Utah, United States

- IUCN category Ib (wilderness area)
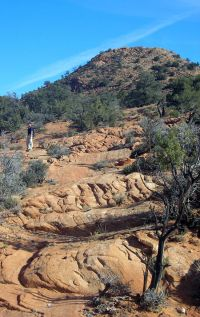
- Red Mountain Wilderness

- Location within the United States
- Location: Washington County, Utah, USA
- Nearest city: Ivins, UT
- Coordinates: 37°14′34″N 113°42′09″W
- Area: 18,729 acres (75.8 km^{2})
- Established: March 30, 2009
- Governing body: Bureau of Land Management

The Red Mountain Wilderness (Utah) is a 18,729-acre (75.8 km^{2}) wilderness area in the US state of Utah. It was designated March 30, 2009, as part of the Omnibus Public Land Management Act of 2009. Located six miles northeast of St. George, it is bordered by Snow Canyon State Park to the east and the Shivwitz Indian Reservation to the southwest. Approximately one-half of the wilderness is located within the recently designated Red Cliffs National Conservation Area. Prehistoric use by the Southern Paiute Indians has been documented at seven sites in the area, and the BLM estimates archeological site densities between 4 and 40 per square mile.

The namesake of the wilderness is Red Mountain, a great block of Navajo sandstone bounded by the Gunlock Fault on the west, and by the Santa Clara River valley and Snow Canyon on the south and east.

== Vegetation ==
The mixing of species from the Mojave and Great Basin deserts makes for unusually diverse vegetation in the Red Mountains Wilderness, which includes pinyon pine, juniper, sagebrush, ponderosa pine, yucca, agave, and Gambel oak.

== Wildlife ==
Common wildlife in the wilderness include mule deer, mountain lion, peregrine falcon, and bald eagle.

== See also ==
- List of U.S. Wilderness Areas
- Wilderness Act
