= Elk Ridge, Utah =

City in Utah, United States

Elk Ridge
- City
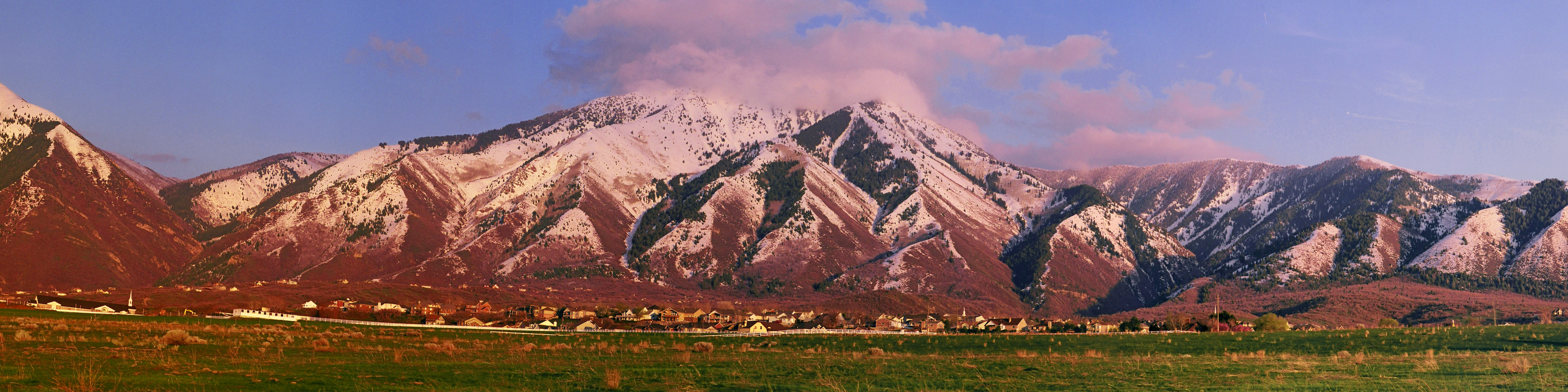
- Panorama of Elk Ridge

- Flag

- Location in Utah County and the state of Utah
- Coordinates: 40°00′20″N 111°40′25″W
- Country: United States
- State: Utah
- County: Utah
- Developed: 1970-1973
- Incorporated (town): December 22, 1976
- Incorporated (city): November 3, 2000
- Named for: Elk

Area
  - Total: 2.8 sq mi (7.3 km^{2})
  - Land: 2.8 sq mi (7.3 km^{2})
  - Water: 0 sq mi (0.00 km^{2})
- Elevation: 5,361 ft (1,634 m)

Population (2020)
  - Total: 4,687
  - Density: 1,662.9/sq mi (642.05/km^{2})
- Time zone: UTC-7 (Mountain (MST))
  - Summer (DST): UTC-6 (MDT)
- ZIP code: 84651
- Area codes: 385, 801
- FIPS code: 49-22370
- GNIS feature ID: 2410426
- Website: Official website

Elk Ridge is a city in Utah County, Utah, United States. It originally incorporated as a town named Salem Hills. It changed its name in 1978 to Elk Ridge, named for the herds of elk that wintered in the area. It is part of the Provo–Orem, Utah Metropolitan Statistical Area. The population was 4,687 at the time of the 2020 census.

Elk Ridge became a fifth-class city by state law in November 2000.

== History and geography ==
The area that later became Elk Ridge was originally part of Goosenest Ranch at the foot of Mount Loafer at the southern end of Utah County southeast of Salem and Payson. A dirt road was built in 1970 after the ranch was sold, and it was developed into a settlement called Salem Hills. The first home was completed in 1973. The settlement incorporated as a town on December 22, 1976 after gaining over 100 residents, and the town changed its name to Elk Ridge in 1978. The new name was taken from the large herds of elk that roamed the area in and around the town.

The first official government census of the town was in 1980, and the population was 381. It became a fifth-class city in Utah in 2000 when its official population exceeded 1000. According to the United States Census Bureau, the city has a total area of 2.8 square miles (7.3 km^{2}), all land.

== Demographics ==
Historical population
Census	Pop.	Note	%±
1980	381		—
1990	771		102.4%
2000	1,838		138.4%
2010	2,436		32.5%
2020	4,687		92.4%
U.S. Decennial Census; Census Bureau profile

=== 2020 census ===
As of the 2020 census, Elk Ridge had a population of 4,687, up from 1,838 in 2000. The median age was 27.9 years. 38.9% of residents were under the age of 18 and 10.0% of residents were 65 years of age or older. For every 100 females there were 100.5 males, and for every 100 females age 18 and over there were 99.1 males age 18 and over.

96.0% of residents lived in urban areas, while 4.0% lived in rural areas.

Of the 1,145 households in Elk Ridge, 60.2% had children under the age of 18 living in them, 86.4% were married-couple households, 5.4% were households with a male householder and no spouse or partner present, 7.5% were households with a female householder and no spouse or partner present, 4.1% of all households were made up of individuals, and 1.9% had someone living alone who was 65 years of age or older. The average family size was 3.84. About 99.5% of households were owner-occupied. The population density was 1,662.1 people per square mile (642.1/km^{2}), and there were 1,183 housing units at an average density of 419.5 per square mile (162.1/km^{2}). Of those units, 3.2% were vacant, with a homeowner vacancy rate of 0.6% and a rental vacancy rate of 0.0%.

The median income for a household in the town was $126,131, and the median income for a family was $129,904. Males had a median income of $140,250 versus $50,000 for females. The per capita income was $36,724. About 2.9% of the population were below the poverty line, including 2.2% of those under age 18 and 3.1% of those aged 65 or over.

Racial composition as of the 2020 census
Race	Number	Percent
White	4,275	91.2%
Black or African American	17	0.4%
American Indian and Alaska Native	8	0.2%
Asian	28	0.6%
Native Hawaiian and Other Pacific Islander	27	0.6%
Some other race	54	1.2%
Two or more races	278	5.9%
Hispanic or Latino (of any race)	234	5.0%

=== 2000 census ===
As of the census of 2000, there were 1,838 people, 413 households, and 401 families residing in the town. The population density was 662.2 people per square mile (255.3/km^{2}). There were 441 housing units at an average density of 158.9 per square mile (61.2/km^{2}). The racial makeup of the town was 94.99% White, 0.27% Native American, 0.22% Asian, 0.76% Pacific Islander, 2.29% from other races, and 1.47% from two or more races. Hispanic or Latino of any race were 3.26% of the population.

There were 413 households, of which 66.8% had children under 18 living with them, 92.7% were married couples living together, 2.4% had a female householder with no husband present, and 2.9% were non-families. 2.7% of all households were made up of individuals, and 0.5% had someone living alone who was 65 years or older. The average household size was 4.45, and the average family size was 4.52.

In the town, the population was spread out, with 46.1% under 18, 8.22% from 18 to 24, 25.8% from 25 to 44, 15.3% from 45 to 64, and 4.7% who were 65 years of age or older. The median age was 21 years. For every 100 females, there were 107.9 males. For every 100 females aged 18 and over, there were 103.9 males.

The median income for a household in the town was $65,511, and the median income for a family was $65,813. Males had a median income of $50,489 versus $31,667 for females. The per capita income was $18,513. About 2.5% of families and 4.0% of the population were below the poverty line, including 5.3% of those under age 18 and 2.2% of those aged 65 or over.

== See also ==
- List of cities and towns in Utah
