= Goose Creek and China Jim Fire Complex =

2018 wildfire in Nevada

- Part of the 2018 Nevada wildfires
- Date: July 28, 2018 –
- Location: Montello, Nevada
- Coordinates: 41°15′41″N 114°11′39″W

Statistics
- Burned area: 127,059 acres (514 km^{2})

Impacts
- Deaths: 0
- Injuries: 0

Ignition
- Cause: Unknown

Map
- The fires location in northeastern Nevada

The Goose Creek and China Jim Fire Complex were wildfires near the Nevada and Utah border by Montello, Nevada. As of August 4, 2018, the fires had burned a total of 127,059 acres (514.19 km^{2}) acres and was 80% contained.

== Closures ==
State Route 30 was closed on the evening of Saturday, July 28, 2018.

== Evacuations ==
Grouse Creek was evacuated.
