= Woodland Hills, Utah =

City in Utah, United States

- City
- Location in Utah County and the state of Utah
- Coordinates: 40°00′27″N 111°39′16″W
- Country: United States
- State: Utah
- County: Utah
- Founded: 1970
- Incorporated (town): December 14, 1979
- Incorporated (city): November 3, 2000

Area
  - Total: 2.53 sq mi (6.56 km^{2})
  - Land: 2.53 sq mi (6.56 km^{2})
  - Water: 0 sq mi (0.00 km^{2})
- Elevation: 5,699 ft (1,737 m)

Population (2020)
  - Total: 1,521
  - Density: 601.19/sq mi (232.12/km^{2})
- Time zone: UTC-7 (Mountain (MST))
  - Summer (DST): UTC-6 (MDT)
- ZIP code: 84653
- Area code: 385 801
- FIPS code: 49-85050
- GNIS feature ID: 2412302
- Website: woodlandhills-ut.gov

Woodland Hills is a city in Utah County, Utah, United States. It is part of the Provo–Orem Metropolitan Statistical Area. The population was 1,521 at the 2020 census. Woodland Hills became a city at the end of 2000.

As of the 2000 census, Woodland Hills had the highest median income in the state of Utah.

== Geography ==
According to the United States Census Bureau, the city has a total area of 2.0 square miles (5.2 km^{2}), all land.

== Demographics ==
Historical population
Census	Pop.	Note	%±
1980	60		—
1990	301		401.7%
2000	941		212.6%
2010	1,344		42.8%
2020	1,521		13.2%
U.S. Decennial Census

=== 2020 census ===
As of the 2020 census, Woodland Hills had a population of 1,521. The median age was 38.9 years. 30.4% of residents were under the age of 18 and 16.6% of residents were 65 years of age or older. For every 100 females there were 106.9 males, and for every 100 females age 18 and over there were 99.4 males age 18 and over.

0.0% of residents lived in urban areas, while 100.0% lived in rural areas.

There were 414 households in Woodland Hills, of which 40.6% had children under the age of 18 living in them. Of all households, 83.6% were married-couple households, 7.0% were households with a male householder and no spouse or partner present, and 8.0% were households with a female householder and no spouse or partner present. About 7.4% of all households were made up of individuals and 3.2% had someone living alone who was 65 years of age or older.

There were 427 housing units, of which 3.0% were vacant. The homeowner vacancy rate was 0.3% and the rental vacancy rate was 0.0%.

Racial composition as of the 2020 census
Race	Number	Percent
White	1,422	93.5%
Black or African American	11	0.7%
American Indian and Alaska Native	1	0.1%
Asian	8	0.5%
Native Hawaiian and Other Pacific Islander	1	0.1%
Some other race	15	1.0%
Two or more races	63	4.1%
Hispanic or Latino (of any race)	61	4.0%

=== 2000 census ===
As of the census of 2000, there were 941 people, 500 households, and 207 families residing in the town. The population density was 343.3 people per square mile (132.6/km^{2}). There were 229 housing units at an average density of 83.5 per square mile (32.3/km^{2}). The racial makeup of the town was 97.24% White, 0.21% African American, 0.21% Native American, 0.11% Asian, 1.28% from other races, and 0.96% from two or more races. Hispanic or Latino of any race were 2.44% of the population.

There were 220 households, out of which 55.5% had children under the age of 18 living with them, 90.9% were married couples living together, 2.3% had a female householder with no husband present, and 5.9% were non-families. 3.6% of all households were made up of individuals, and 0.5% had someone living alone who was 65 years of age or older. The average household size was 4.28 and the average family size was 4.44.

In the town the population was spread out, with 43.6% under the age of 18, 8.1% from 18 to 24, 23.0% from 25 to 44, 18.4% from 45 to 64, and 7.0% who were 65 years of age or older. The median age was 22 years. For every 100 females, there were 101.1 males. For every 100 females age 18 and over, there were 97.4 males.

The median income for a household in the town was $80,854, and the median income for a family was $82,358. Males had a median income of $66,042 versus $32,361 for females. The per capita income for the town was $25,184. About 2.6% of families and 3.0% of the population were below the poverty line, including 2.2% of those under age 18 and 5.7% of those age 65 or over.

== See also ==
- List of cities and towns in Utah
