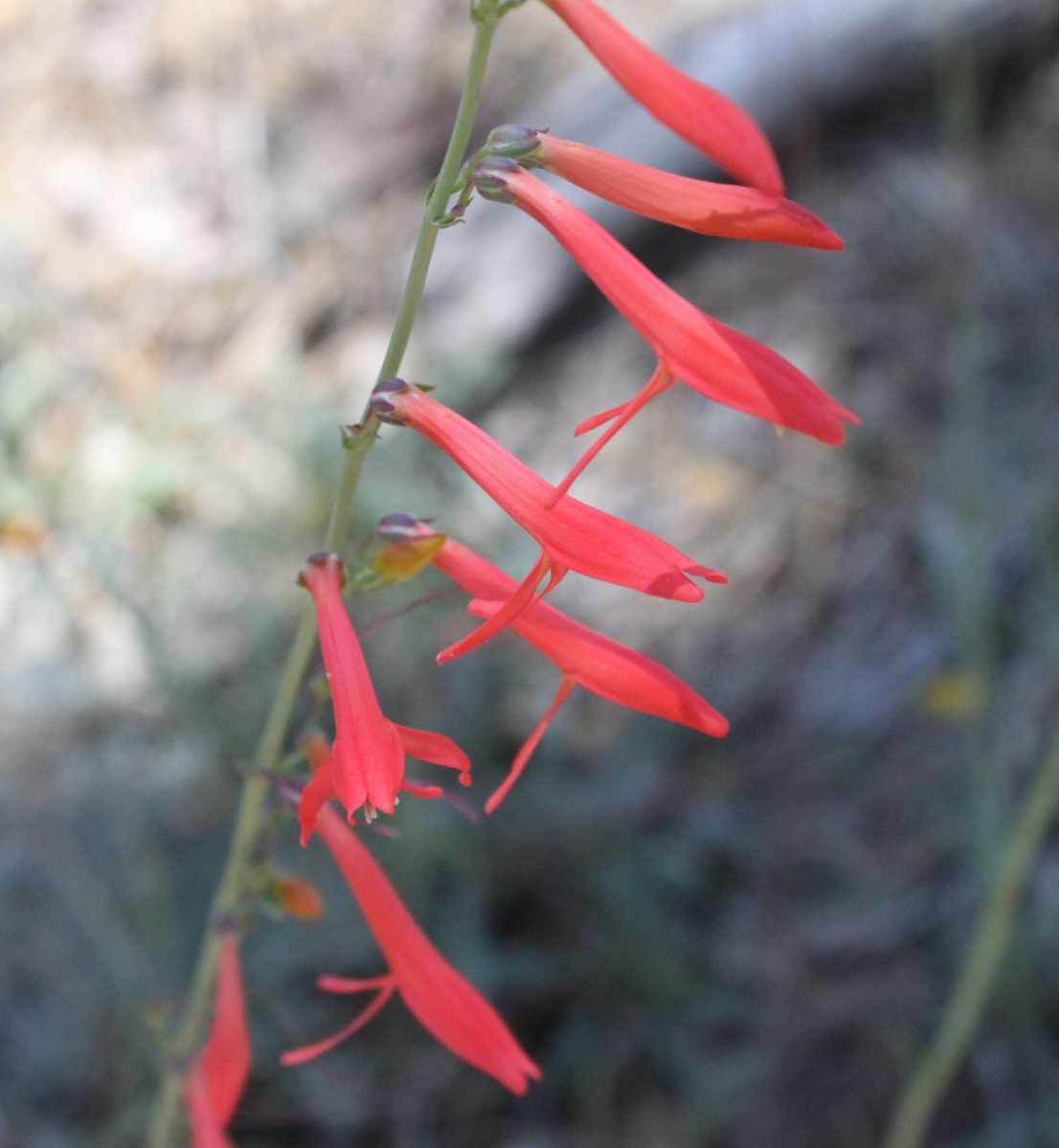

Conservation status
- Apparently Secure (NatureServe)

Scientific classification
- Kingdom: Plantae
- Clade: Tracheophytes
- Clade: Angiosperms
- Clade: Eudicots
- Clade: Asterids
- Order: Lamiales
- Family: Plantaginaceae
- Genus: Penstemon
- Species: P. labrosus

Binomial name
- Penstemon labrosus (A.Gray) Hook.f.

= Penstemon labrosus =

Species of flowering plant

Penstemon labrosus is a species of penstemon known by the common name San Gabriel beardtongue. It is native to the Transverse Ranges of southern California, including the San Gabriel Mountains, and the Peninsular Ranges to the south, its distribution extending into Mexico. It grows in forest and woodland habitat. It is a perennial herb growing erect to about 70 centimeters tall. The long, paired leaves are linear in shape with rolled, untoothed edges, and reach over 8 centimeters in maximum length. The inflorescence produces bright red to orange or yellowish flowers 3 to 4 centimeters long. The upper lip is hood-shaped and the lower is divided into 3 narrow lobes which are sometimes reflexed. The flower is hairless, including the staminode.

== Range and habitat ==
Penstemon labrosus is native to both California and Baja California. In Baja California it grows at 1,550 meters and higher in the Sierra de Juárez and on Sierra de San Pedro Mártir.

This plant tends to grow on granitic slopes and is associated with pine and oak tree habitats.
