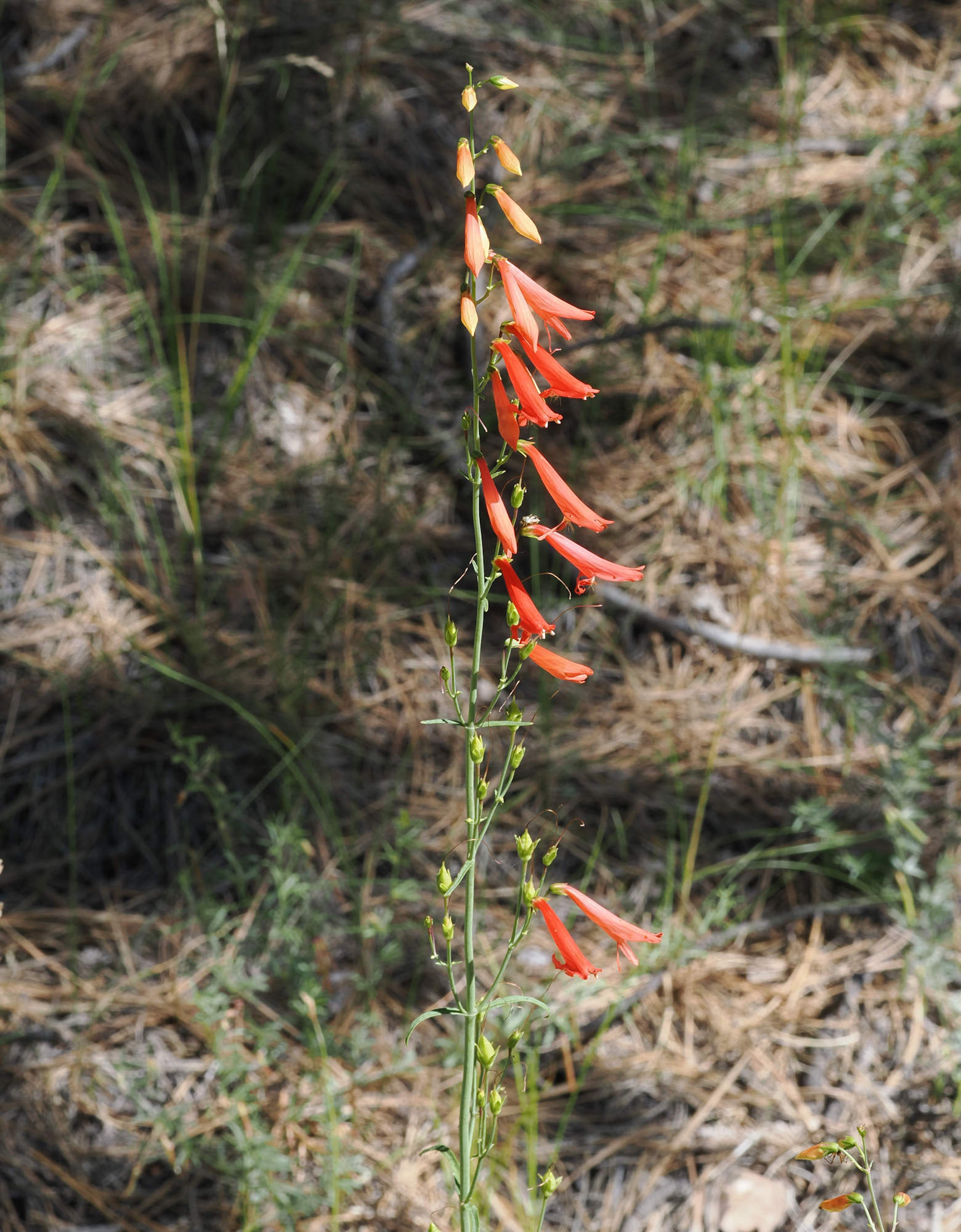
- North Rim, Grand Canyon National Park

Conservation status
- Secure (NatureServe)

Scientific classification
- Kingdom: Plantae
- Clade: Tracheophytes
- Clade: Angiosperms
- Clade: Eudicots
- Clade: Asterids
- Order: Lamiales
- Family: Plantaginaceae
- Genus: Penstemon
- Species: P. barbatus

Binomial name
- Penstemon barbatus (Cav.) Roth

Varieties
- P. barbatus var. barbatus; P. barbatus var. torreyi (Benth.) A.Gray; P. barbatus var. trichander A.Gray

Synonyms
- Chelone barbata Cav.; Elmigera barbata (Cav.) Rchb. ex Steud.

= Penstemon barbatus =

Plant species in the plantain family

Penstemon barbatus, known by the common names golden-beard penstemon, and beardlip penstemon, is a flowering plant native to the western United States.

The plant has spikes of clustered, tubular, scarlet blossoms with yellow hairs on their lower lip; the flowers are very attractive to hummingbirds. It is commonly grown in xeriscape and conventional gardens.

The late-summer flowering of Penstemon barbatus coincides with the southern migration of the rufous hummingbird (Selasphorus rufus), and the hummingbirds use the flowers as "filling stations" for their long trip south.

== Description ==
Penstemon barbatus usually has stems that grow straight upwards, but sometimes they grow outwards from the base of the plant for a short distance before curving to grow upwards. It may be 30 to 100 centimeters (1.0 to 3.3 ft) tall. Plants may have just one flowering stem or many.

Leaves on the plants may be smooth, partly, or uniformly puberulent, covered in hairs. At times they may be glabrous, hairless, on the upper side of the leaves while the undersides are puberulous. The basal leaves, leaves springing directly from the base of the plant, and those attached low on the stems range in size from 3–14 centimeters (1.2–5.5 in), though usually less than 8 cm (3.1 in). Their width ranges from as little as 6 millimeters to 35 mm, but usually between 12 and 30 mm. Their shape is oblanceolate, resembling a reversed spear head, with the base tapered and the widest part past the middle of the leaf, and are attached by petioles, leaf stems. The upper cauline leaves, those attached further up the stem, are narrowly lanceolate or linear, shaped like a thin spear head or long and narrow like a blade of grass. They measure between 28 and 142 mm (1.1 and 5.6 in) long and just 1 to 15 mm wide, usually less than 8 mm wide. The base is tapered and attached directly to the stem while the tip is acuminate, long and drawn out, or at least narrowly pointed.

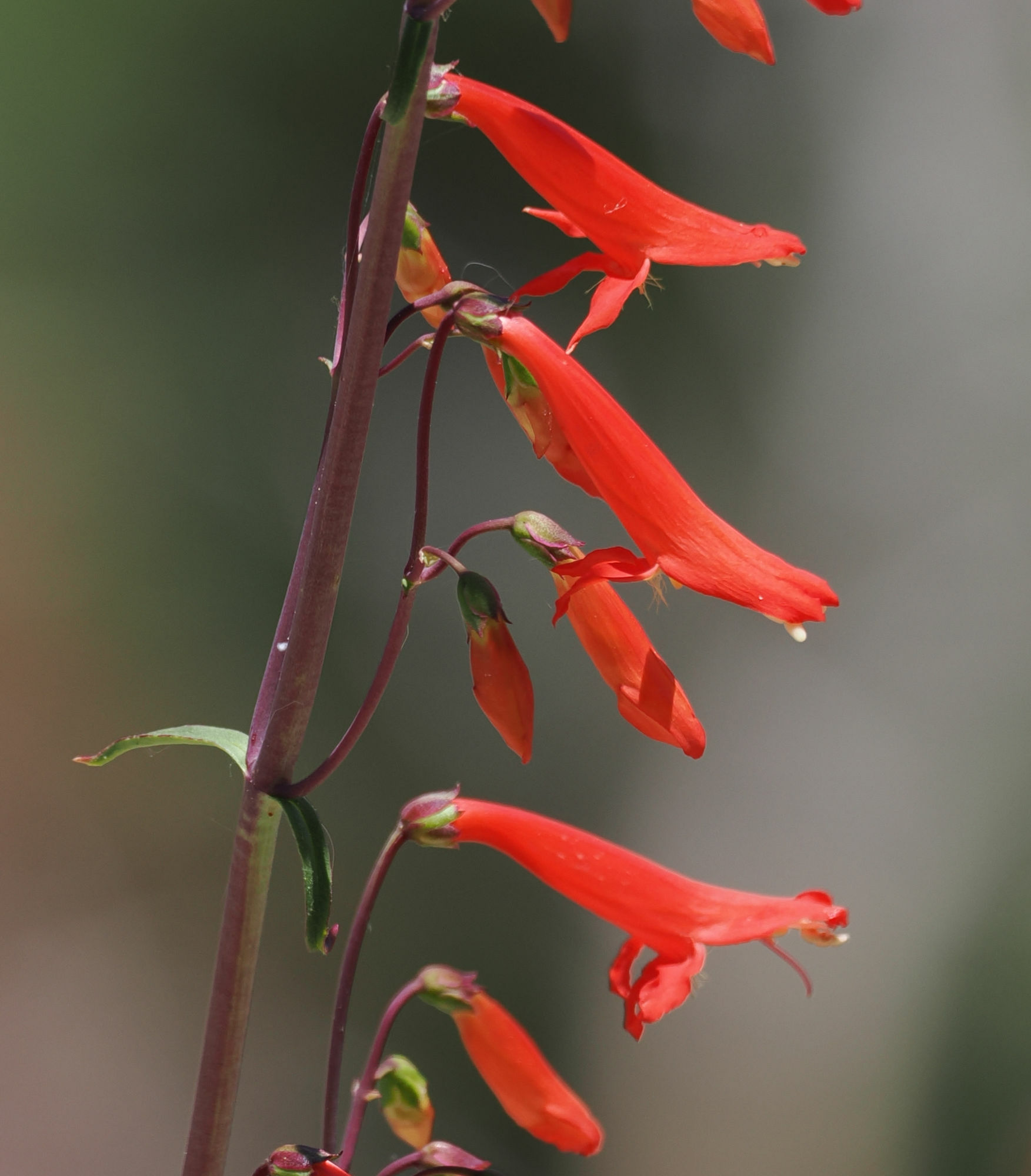
Side view of flowers showing length of floral tube

The inflorescence has six to nineteen groups of flowers, each with a pair of bracts under where the peduncles, the flower stalks, attach each flower to the main stem. In each group there are two cymes, points of attachment with a subgroup of flowers, each on opposite side of the main stem with one to four flowers, though usually at least two. The flowers are narrow, bright scarlet, orange-red, or crimson tubes that are smooth on the outside while having white to golden hairs inside the tube. The length of the flower is 26 to 36 millimeters (1.0 to 1.4 in).

== Taxonomy ==
The botanist Antonio José Cavanilles named this species Chelone barbata in 1795. The species was renamed as Penstemon barbatus by Albrecht Wilhelm Roth in 1806, moving it to the Penstemon genus.

=== Varieties ===
It has three accepted varieties:

- P. barbatus var. barbatus
- P. barbatus var. torreyi (Benth.) A.Gray
- P. barbatus var. trichander A.Gray

=== Synonyms ===
According to Plants of the World Online there are 21 synonyms of Penstemon barbatus or its three varieties.

Table of Synonyms
| Name | Year | Rank | Synonym of: | Notes |
|---|---|---|---|---|
| Chelone antwerpiensis Tougard | 1840 | species | var. barbatus | = het. |
| Chelone barbata Cav. | 1795 | species | P. barbatus | ≡ hom. |
| Chelone formosa J.C.Wendl. | 1798 | species | var. barbatus | = het. |
| Chelone formosa J.Thomps. | 1798 | species | var. barbatus | = het. |
| Chelone mexicana Paxton | 1838 | species | var. barbatus | = het. |
| Chelone mexicana Sessé & Moc. | 1894 | species | var. barbatus | = het. nom. illeg. |
| Elmigera barbata (Cav.) Rchb. ex Steud. | 1840 | species | P. barbatus | ≡ hom. |
| Penstemon angustifolius C.Fraser ex Pursh | 1813 | species | var. barbatus | = het. not validly publ. |
| Penstemon barbatus var. carneus Lindl. | 1839 | variety | var. barbatus | = het. |
| Penstemon barbatus f. flaviflorus (M.E.Jones) Pennell | 1945 | form | var. barbatus | = het. |
| Penstemon barbatus var. puberulus A.Gray | 1859 | variety | var. barbatus | = het. |
| Penstemon barbatus subsp. torreyi (Benth.) D.D.Keck | 1939 | subspecies | var. torreyi | ≡ hom. |
| Penstemon barbatus f. torreyi (Benth.) Voss | 1894 | form | var. torreyi | ≡ hom. |
| Penstemon barbatus subsp. trichander (A.Gray) D.D.Keck | 1939 | subspecies | var. trichander | ≡ hom. |
| Penstemon coccineus Engelm. | 1848 | species | var. barbatus | = het. |
| Penstemon coccineus var. filifolius A.Gray | 1886 | variety | var. barbatus | = het. |
| Penstemon coeruleus Torr. | 1827 | species | var. barbatus | = het. nom. illeg. |
| Penstemon flaviflorus M.E.Jones | 1908 | species | var. barbatus | = het. |
| Penstemon formosus (J.Thomps.) Trautv. | 1839 | species | var. barbatus | = het. |
| Penstemon torreyi Benth. | 1846 | species | var. torreyi | ≡ hom. |
| Penstemon trichander (A.Gray) Rydb. | 1906 | species | var. trichander | ≡ hom. |
Notes: ≡ homotypic synonym; = heterotypic synonym

=== Names ===
One of the English common names for Penstemon barbatus is golden beard penstemon, referring to the gold colored hairs inside the flowers. It is also known as scarlet penstemon, red penstemon, and scarlet bugler. The name hummingbird flower is also used for this species, though this name is also applied to many other plants. In Spanish-speaking New Mexico and southern Colorado, it is called varita de San Jose – "St. Joseph's staff".

In the Hopi language it is called pala'ka'tsi, but other unrelated species including scarlet gilia (Ipomopsis aggregata) are also called this.

== Distribution and habitat ==
Penstemon barbatus grows in the Four Corners states, Texas, and in much of Mexico. In Colorado it grows largely in southern mountain counties, only being found as far north as Garfield County. The native range of the species in Utah does not go so far north with it reaching to Wayne and San Juan counties. Only the southeastern quarter of New Mexico lacks reports of the species and it grows in much of Arizona. Most of the range of P. barbatus in Texas is in the counties in the Big Bend region and to the north in the state's far west.

This species is very common in the northern parts of Mexico. In the northwest it grow in two of four states, Sinaloa and Sonora. While in the northeast it grows in every state including, Aguascalientes, Chihuahua, Coahuila, Durango, Guanajuato, Hidalgo, Nuevo León, Querétaro, San Luis Potosí, and Tamaulipas. In the central highlands it grows in both Mexico City and the larger State of Mexico as well as the three other states of Morelos, Puebla, and Tlaxcala. It also grows in the gulf state of Veracruz. It becomes much less widespread in the south with it only reported in Chiapas in the southeast and in Jalisco, Michoacán, and Oaxaca in the southwest.

The variety barbatus is associated with piñon–juniper woodlands, ponderosa pine forests and Douglas-fir forests in the southern parts of their ranges, and with Gambel oak, usually at elevations of 1,200 to 3,000 meters (3,900 to 9,800 ft), but occasionally as high as 3,400 meters (11,200 ft). Similarly, var. torreyi is associated with all but the piñon–juniper woodlands, but additionally grows in spruce-fir woodland and montane meadows at elevations of 1,800 to 3,200 meters (5,900 to 10,500 ft). Variety trichander is only associated with piñon–juniper woodlands and birch-maple woodlands at elevations of 1,600 to 2,200 meters (5,200 to 7,200 ft).

=== Conservation ===
In 1992 NatureServe evaluated Penstemon barbatus as secure (G5) at the global level. They have not evaluated the species at the state level.

== Uses ==
The Zuni people rub the chewed root of the torreyi subspecies over the rabbit stick to ensure success in the hunt.

== See also ==
List of Penstemon species
