= Dixie National Forest =

US National Forest in Utah

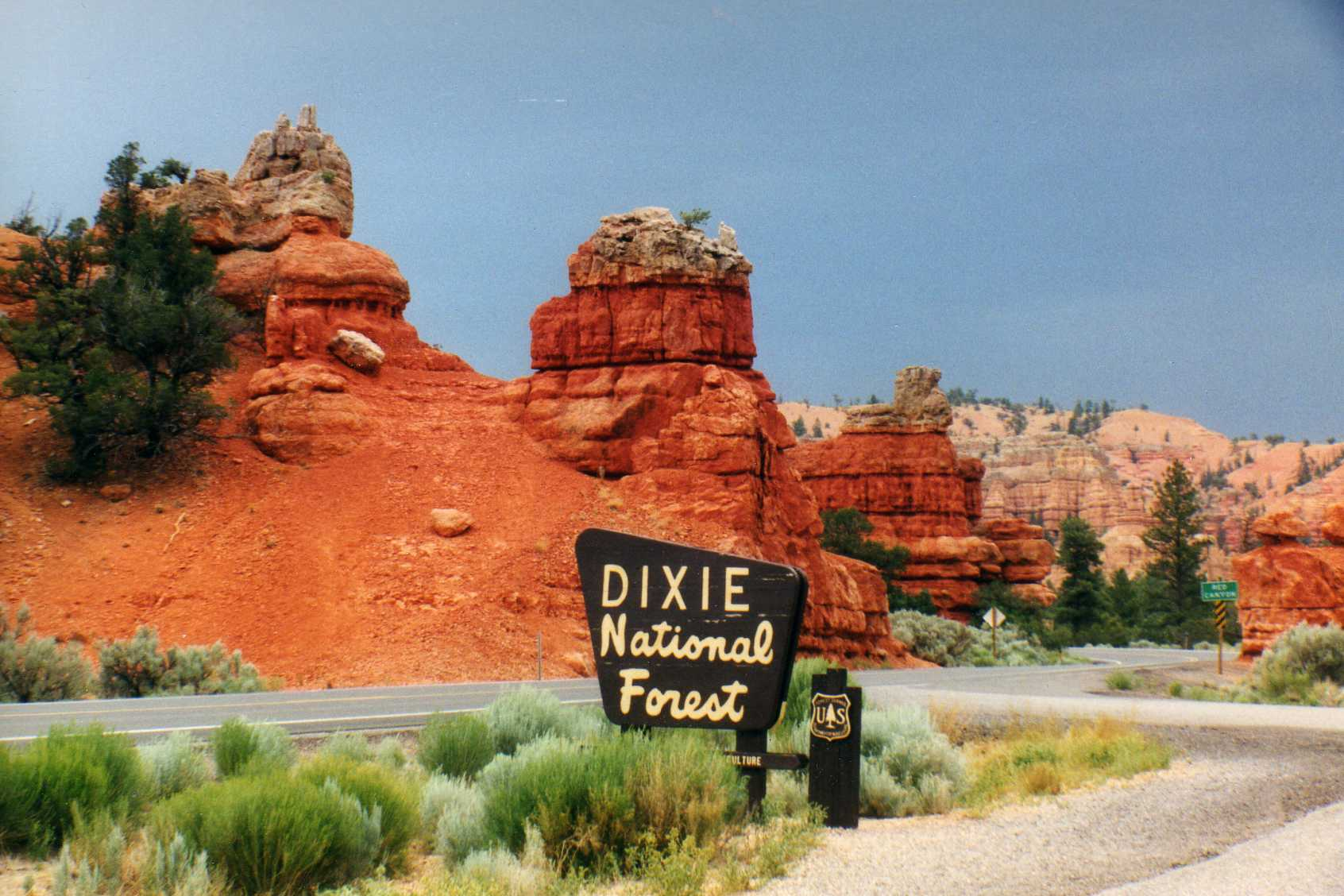
- Red Canyon at Scenic Byway 12
- Location: Garfield, Iron, Kane, Piute, Washington, and Wayne counties, Utah, U.S.
- Nearest city: Cedar City, UT
- Coordinates: 38°02′N 111°38′W
- Area: 1,889,106 acres (7,644.94 km^{2})
- Established: September 25, 1905
- Visitors: 700,000 (in 2006)
- Governing body: U.S. Forest Service
- Website: Dixie National Forest

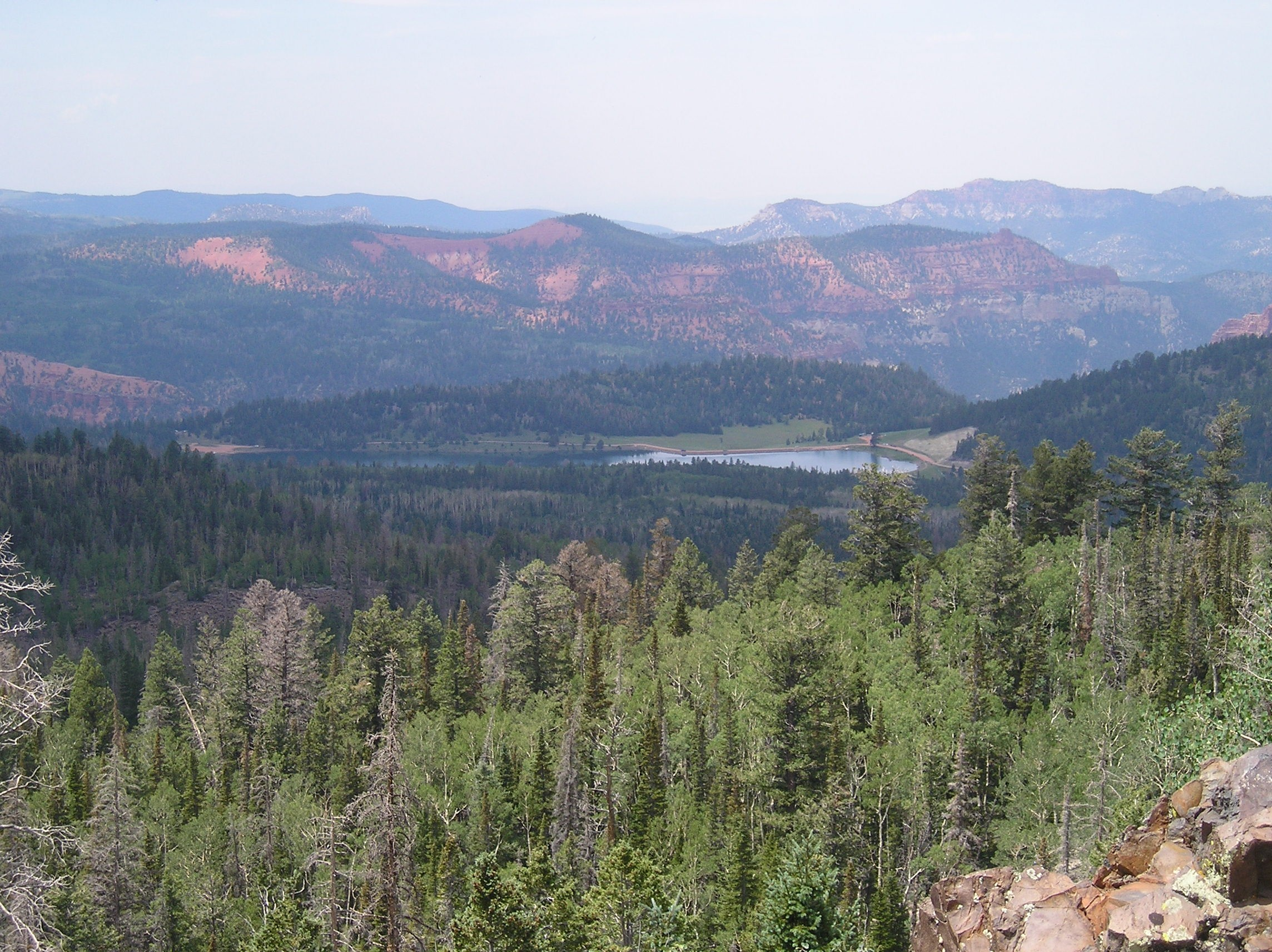
Dixie National Forest from Yankee Meadow Overlook

Dixie National Forest is a United States national forest in Utah with headquarters in Cedar City. It occupies almost two million acres (8,000 km^{2}) and stretches for about 170 miles (270 km) across southern Utah. The largest national forest in Utah, it straddles the divide between the Great Basin and the Colorado River. In descending order of forestland area it is located in parts of Garfield, Washington, Iron, Kane, Wayne, and Piute counties. The majority (over 55%) of forest acreage lies in Garfield County.

Elevations vary from 2,800 feet (850 m) above sea level near St. George, Utah to 11,322 feet (3,451 m) at Blue Bell Knoll on Boulder Mountain. The southern rim of the Great Basin, near the Colorado River, provides spectacular scenery. Colorado River canyons are made up of multi-colored cliffs and steep-walled gorges.

The Forest is divided into four geographic areas. High altitude forests in gently rolling hills characterize the Markagunt, Paunsaugunt, and Aquarius Plateaus. Boulder Mountain, one of the largest high-elevation plateaus in the United States, is dotted with hundreds of small lakes 10,000–11,000 feet (3,000–3,400 m) above sea level. The forest includes the Pine Valley Mountains north of St. George.

The Forest has many climatic extremes. Precipitation ranges from 10 inches (250 mm) in the lower elevations to more than 40 inches (1,000 mm) per year near Brian Head 11,307 feet (3,446 m). At the higher elevations, most of the annual precipitation falls as snow. Thunderstorms are common during July and August and produce heavy rains. In some areas, August is the wettest month of the year.

Temperature extremes can be impressive, with summer temperatures exceeding 100 °F (38 °C) near St. George and winter lows exceeding −30 °F (−34 °C) on the plateau tops.

The vegetation of the Forest grades from sparse, desert-type plants at the lower elevations to stand of low-growing pinyon pine and juniper dominating the mid-elevations. At the higher elevations, aspen and conifers such as pine, spruce, and fir predominate.

The Dixie Forest Reserve was established on September 25, 1905 by the United States General Land Office. The name was derived from the local description of the warm southern part of Utah as "Dixie". In 1906 the U.S. Forest Service assumed responsibility for the lands, and on March 4, 1907 it became a National Forest. The western part of Sevier National Forest was added on July 1, 1922, and all of Powell National Forest on October 1, 1944.

== Visitor centers ==
There are local ranger district offices and visitor centers in

- Cedar City, with Duck Creek Visitor Center
- Escalante, with Escalante Interagency Visitor Center
- Pine Valley, in St. George, with Pine Valley Heritage Center
- Powell, in Panguitch, with Red Canyon Visitor Center

== Wilderness areas ==
There are four officially designated wilderness areas within Dixie National Forest that are part of the National Wilderness Preservation System.

- Ashdown Gorge Wilderness
- Box-Death Hollow Wilderness
- Cottonwood Forest Wilderness
- Pine Valley Mountain Wilderness

== See also ==
- List of national forests of the United States
- List of wilderness areas of the United States
- Bryce Canyon Natural History Association
- Panguitch Lake
- Paunsaugunt Plateau
- Podunk
- West Valley Fire
