= Simon Magus in popular culture =

The stories of the rogue sorcerer Simon Magus and his consort Helen, which showcased the early battles between religion and magic, have often captured the imagination of artists and writers.

Simon Magus, a figure from early Christianity, has been featured in various forms of art, literature, and popular culture throughout history. His legend has influenced works ranging from Irish mythology and Dante Alighieri's Divine Comedy to the Faust legend and modern literature. Simon Magus has been portrayed in theatre, poetry, opera, film, television, comics, and video games. His story has been particularly influential in literature, with appearances in works by authors such as Henry Wadsworth Longfellow, Robert A. Heinlein, and Umberto Eco. In visual arts, the fall of Simon Magus has been a popular subject for painters and sculptors, including Filippino Lippi and Benozzo Gozzoli.

== Folklore ==
In Irish mythology, Mug Ruith is said to have been a student of Simon Magus, who taught him his magic skills and helped him build the flying machine roth rámach. Mug Ruith's daughter Tlachtga was raped by the three sons of Simon Magus and returned to Ireland where she gave birth to triplets on the hill that would bear her name.

== Theatre and poetry ==
- In Canto XIX of the Divine Comedy's Inferno by Dante Alighieri, Simon is in the third bolgia of the eighth circle of Hell.
- Simon and Helen appear in Christus: A Mystery and Helen of Tyre by Henry Wadsworth Longfellow.

=== Faust ===
Many aspects of the life of Simon Magus are echoed in the later Faust legend of Christopher Marlowe and Johann Wolfgang von Goethe. Hans Jonas writes, "surely few admirers of Marlowe's and Goethe's plays have an inkling that their hero is the descendant of a gnostic sectary, and that the beautiful Helen called up by his art was once the fallen Thought of God through whose raising mankind was to be saved."

- The presence of Helen of Troy.
- The name "Faustus" ("the favored one"), both as a possible appellation of Simon in Rome, and with a person by that name appearing in the Clementine literature. Later, Augustine of Hippo became a fierce opponent of a certain Faustus the Manichean.
- The homunculus.
- Faust is employed by the Emperor, just as Simon is employed by Nero.
- The ascent of Gretchen and Faust past the demons of Mephistopheles in Faust Part One and Faust Part Two, respectively, can be seen as mirroring the descent of the Ennoia and Simon past the world-creating angels. Additionally, the passage wherein Mephistopheles is distracted by the allures of seductive angels has its parallel in the Ennoia arousing desires in the world-creating angels who prevent her initial ascent.

== Opera ==
Simon is the principal villain in Arrigo Boito’s opera, Nerone (“Nero”).

== Film ==
- Simon Magus is portrayed as a pivotal character, "Simon the Magician," played by Jack Palance, in the 1954 movie The Silver Chalice (which also debuted a young Paul Newman).
- In the 1997 movie The Saint during the opening scene, the protagonist Simon Templar refers to himself as Simon Magus, the magician.
- In the 1999 movie Simon Magus, the mystery of Simon Magus is set in contemporary Paris.

== Television ==
In the Year Two Space: 1999 episode "New Adam, New Eve", an extraterrestrial called "Magus" pretends to be God in front of the terrestrial inhabitants of Moonbase Alpha, but, when it is revealed that he is not the Lord, he tries to search pity in the Alphans by saying that he was, among the others who tried to imitate God, Simon Magus.

== Books ==
- Simon is the hero of a series of short stories and novels by Richard L. Tierney, set in the Cthulhu Mythos.
- According to the book The Templar Revelation, Simon Magus (not Jesus Christ) was the true heir of John the Baptist.
- Simon Magus was a villain in an early issue of DC Comics' original Justice League of America comic book series, and made a total of twelve appearances in DC Comics.
- A heroic sorcerer named Simon Magus appears in the comic book series Astro City by Kurt Busiek.
- In his 1961 novel Stranger in a Strange Land, science fiction writer Robert A. Heinlein refers to a character named "Professor" Simon Magus, a carnival grifter and mentalist who is described as a "likable scoundrel."
- In Illuminatus! a figure described as a transcended former human, who is also referred to as Satan, and calls himself "Malaclypse the Elder", claims that he had impersonated Jesus after the crucifixion, and after that had travelled under the name of Simon Magus.
- A character based on Simon Magus appears in Foucault's Pendulum by Umberto Eco.
- Simon Magus appears in the 2001 Scott McBain novel The Coins of Judas.
- Simon Magus is one of the central figures in Robin Cook's book Intervention.
- In David Guterson's 2008 novel The Other John William Barry frequently signs his name as Simon Magus.
- In Book of Magic, a sourcebook for the Mutants & Masterminds role-playing game, Simon Magus was one of the "Master Mages" (skilled mages tasked with protecting the Earth dimension from mystical threats), and forged The Pact, a binding spell that altered/strengthened the dimensional barriers so much that the gods and other entities from outside Earth's dimension could no longer enter without being called upon by mortal power and permission.
- The character of Simon Leclerc in Charles Williams's All Hallow's Eve is based on Simon Magus.
- The Illusionist, a novel by Anita Mason, is a fictionalised account of the life and death of Simon Magus.
- Glendenning Cram's novel The Acts of Simon Magus is an imagined autobiography of Simon, from his childhood in Samaria to his final downfall in Rome.
- In his 1991 novel Flicker, Theodore Roszak uses Simon Magus or Simon the Magician, in a fictionalized manner, as being the founder of The Cathars, which later become The Orphans Of The Storm in the book's storyline.
- A reference to Simon Magus appears in the M. R. James short story "Lost Hearts". Mr. Abney's special book notes 'It is recorded of Simon Magus that he was able to fly in the air, to become invisible, or to assume any form he pleased, by the agency of a soul of a boy whom, to use the libellous phrase employed by the author of the Clementine Recognitions, he had murdered'.
- The opening story in Danilo Kiš's 1983 collection The Encyclopedia of the Dead, "Simon Magus", retells the confrontation between Simon and Peter agreeing with the account in the Acts of Peter, and provides an additional alternative ending in which Simon asks to be buried alive in order to be resurrected three days later (after which his body is found putrefied).
- Philemon, a central spirit guide figure within Carl Jung's The Red Book is identified as Simon Magus.
- Simon Magus is the main antagonist in Chris Heimerdinger's The Sacred Quest and The Lost Scrolls, the 5th and 6th Books of the Tennis Shoes Adventure Series.
- In God & Golem, Inc., Norbert Wiener summarizes the story of Simon Magus, analogizing the powers and duties of priests to those of modern technologists: "There is a sin, which consists of using the magic of modern automatization to further personal profit or let loose the apocalyptic terrors of nuclear warfare. If this sin is to have a name, let that name be Simony or Sorcery."
- Simon Magus appears as a character in Tom Holt’s 1994 fantasy novel “Grailblazers”.

== Painting and sculpture ==
The fall of Simon Magus has been a favorite subject of artists.

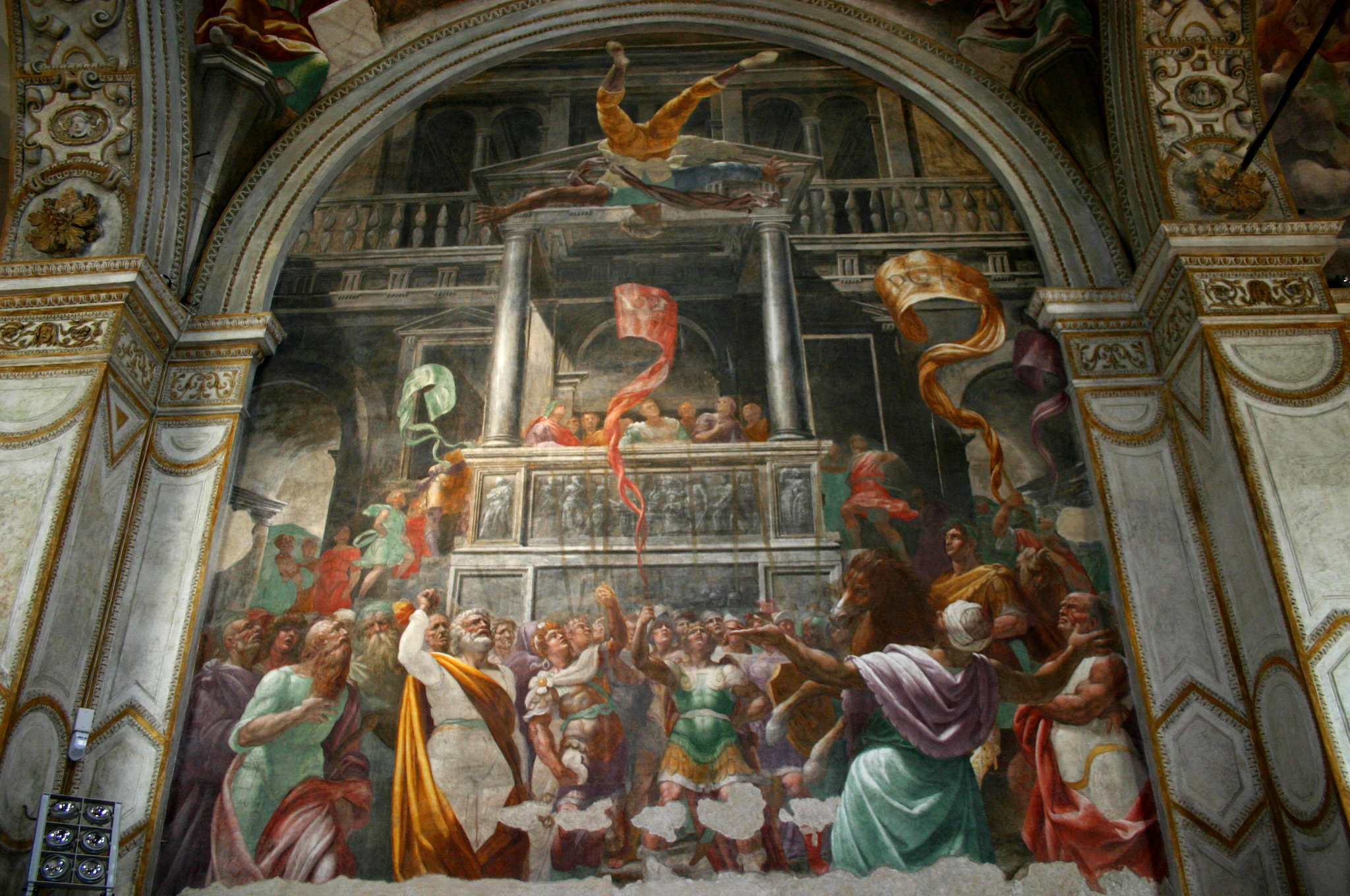
Giovanni Paolo Lomazzo, Saint Peter and the fall of Simon Magus (1571).

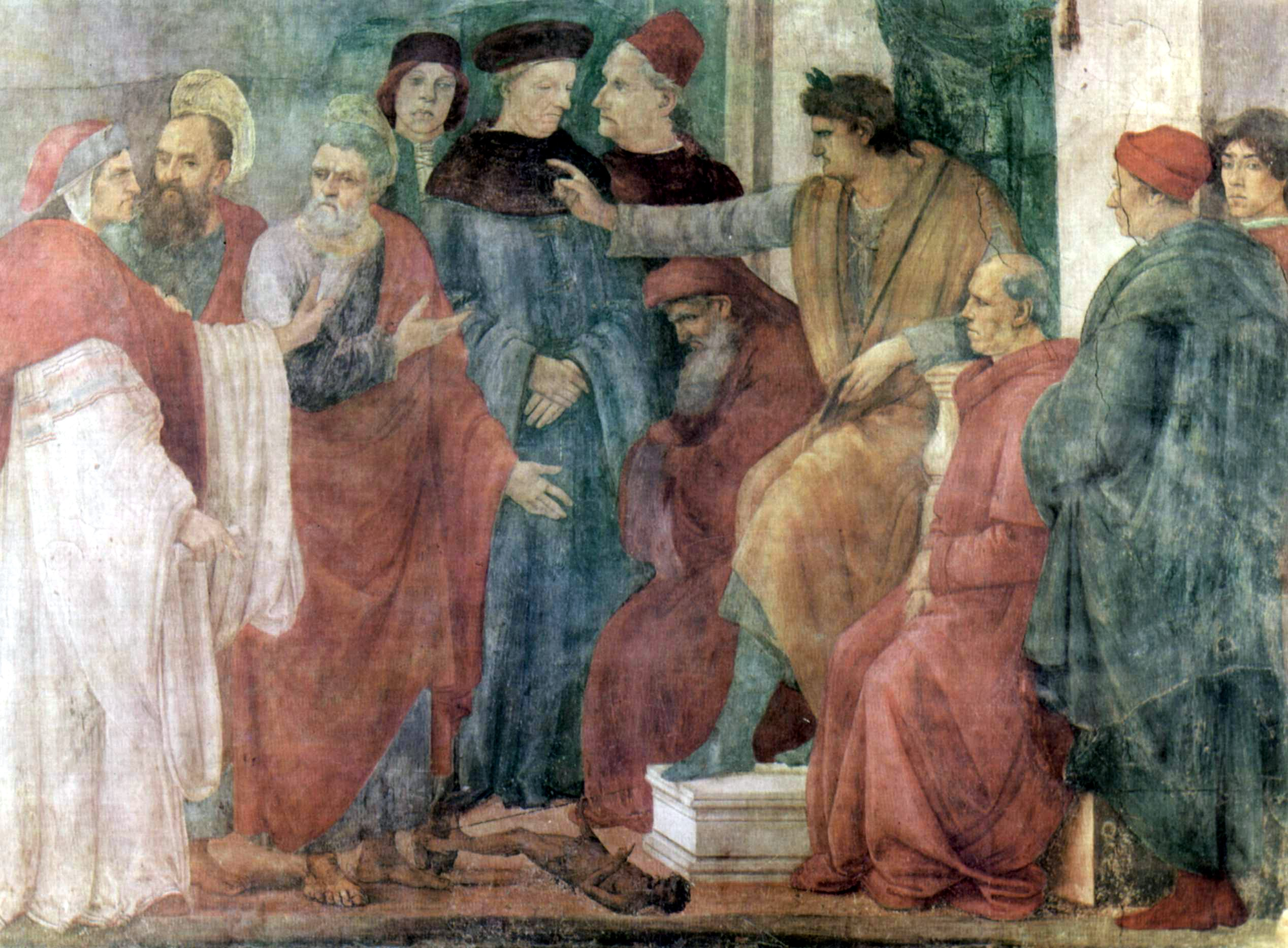
Filippino Lippi, The Apostles Paul and Peter confront Simon Magus before Nero.

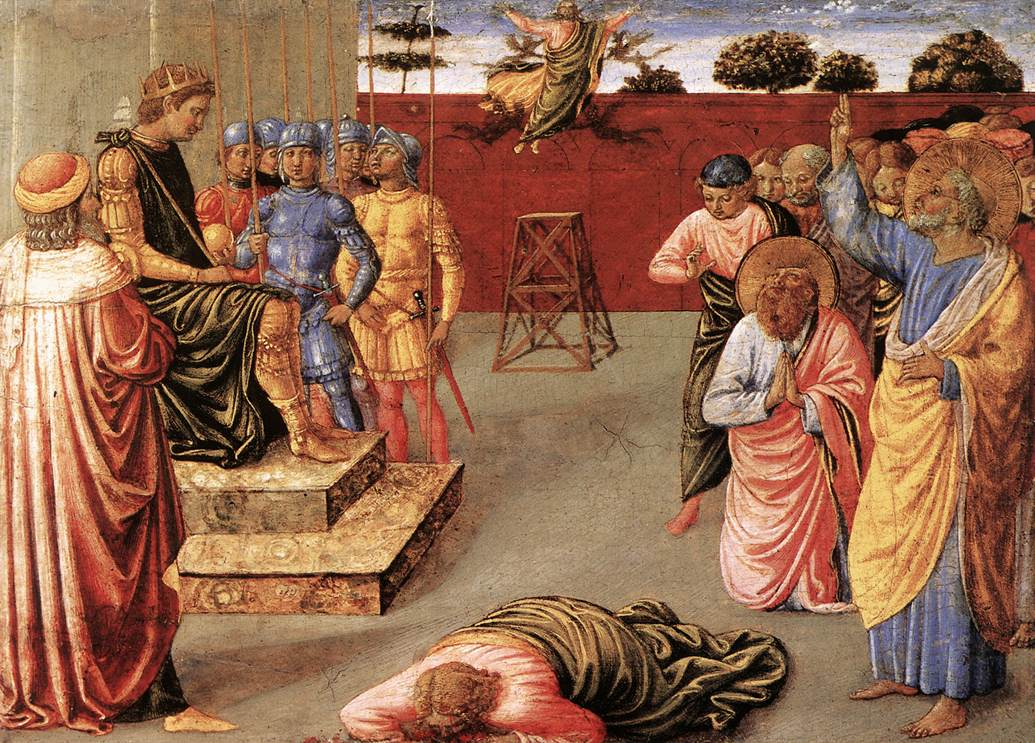
Benozzo Gozzoli, Fall of Simon Magus (1461–1462).

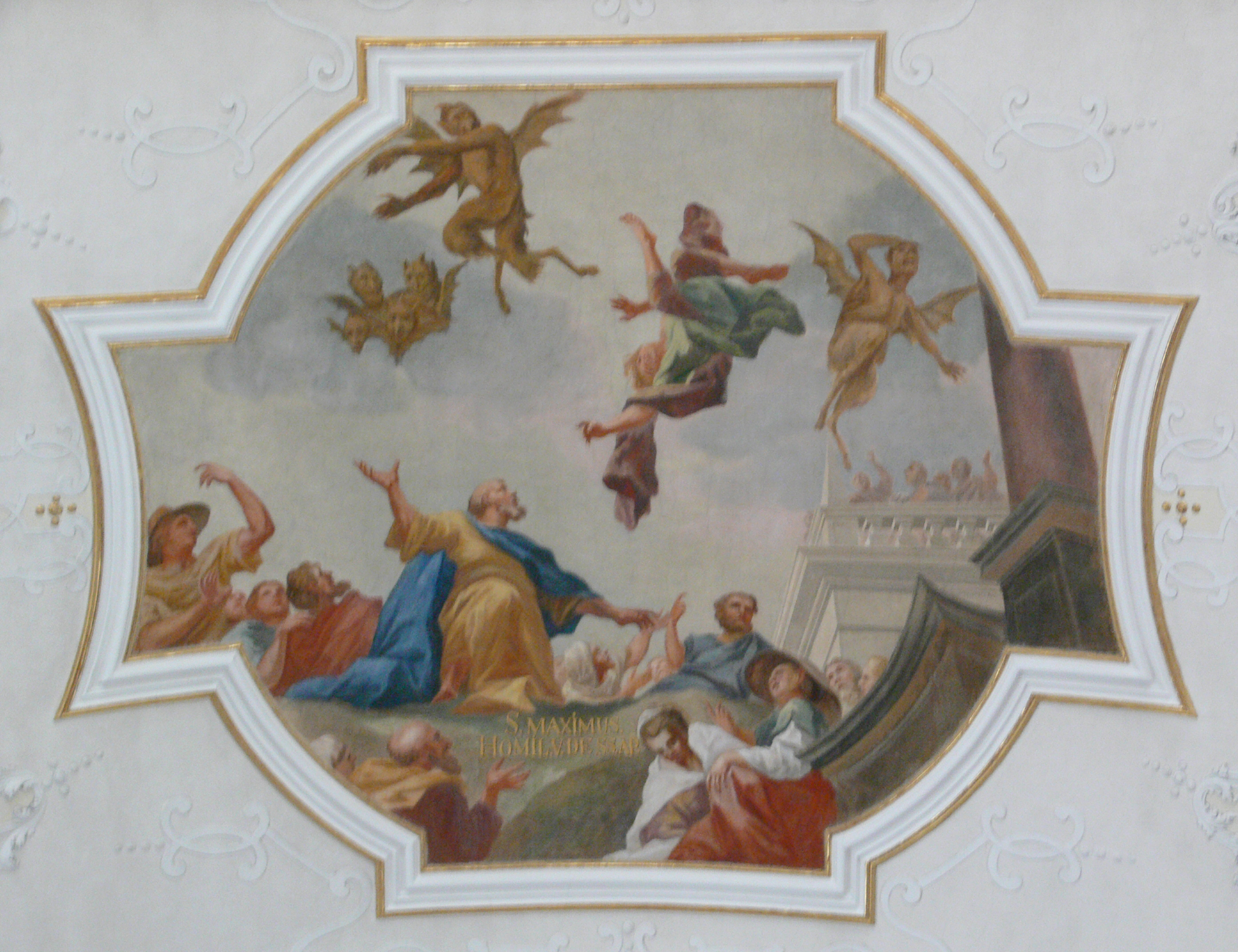
Franz Joseph Spiegler, Zauberer Simon (1727).

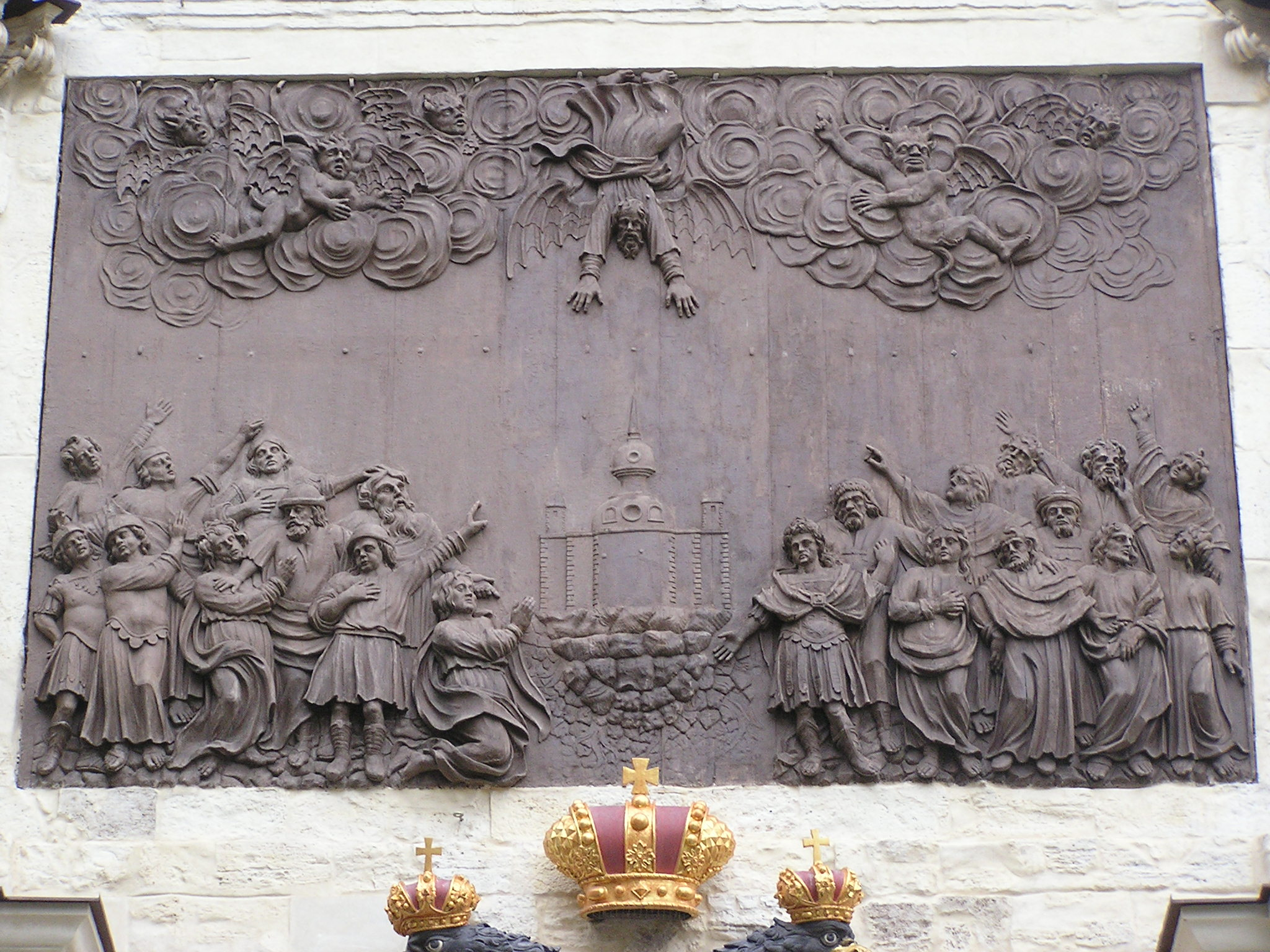
Petrovsky Gate in Peter & Paul Fortress.

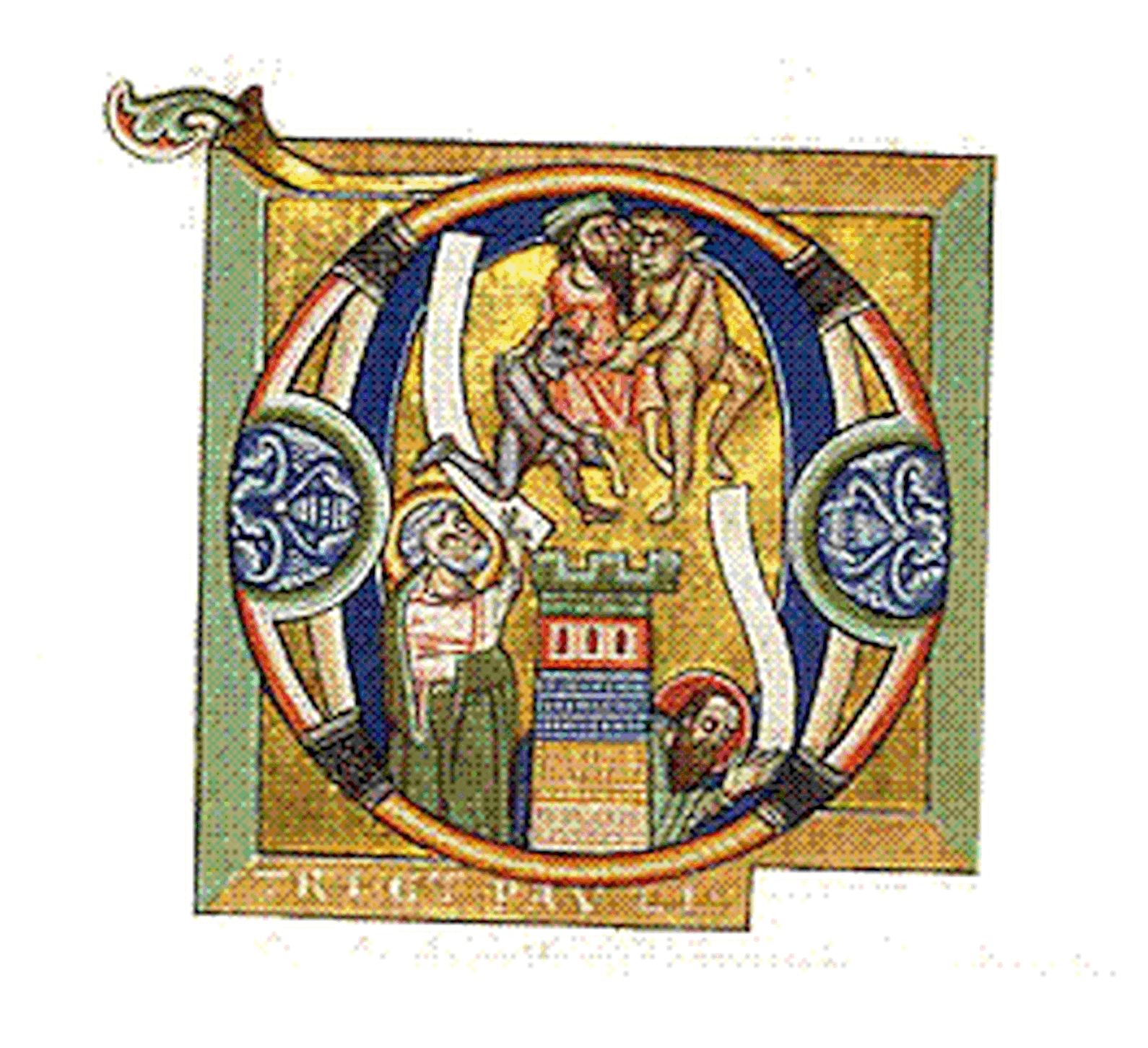
Illuminated manuscript, done at Hildesheim, Germany (1170).

== Video games ==
Simon lends his name (but very little else) to Simon the Sorcerer, a well-known fantasy point-and-click adventure game, which has been followed by a whole series.
