= The Illusionist =

The Illusionist may refer to:

- The Illusionist (Johnston novel), a 1995 novel by Jennifer Johnston
- The Illusionist (Mason novel), a 1983 novel by Anita Mason
- The Illusionist, a translation by Herma Briffault, of Le Rempart des Béguines, by Françoise Mallet-Joris
- The Illusionist (1983 film), a Dutch comedy film
- The Illusionist (2006 film), an American period film set in Vienna
  - "Eisenheim the Illusionist," the short story by Steven Millhauser on which the film is based
- The Illusionist (2010 TV series), a Singaporean TV series
- The Illusionist (2010 film), a French-British animated film
- "The Illusionist", part of "Thus Spoke Zarathustra" by Friedrich Nietzsche
- "The Illusionist", a 2006 song by Swedish melodic death metal band Scar Symmetry from the album Pitch Black Progress
- "Illusionist", a 2020 song by American progressive metalcore band Reflections from the album Willow
- The Illusionists, a touring magic production
