= Liken =

Current Liken Logo

Old Liken Logo

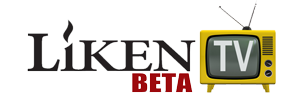
Liken.TV Beta Logo

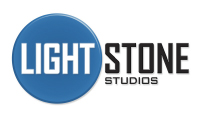
Current Lightstone Studios Logo

Logos From Lightstone Studios

The Liken Series is a continuing musical based on events in the Old Testament and New Testament of the Bible, as well as stories from the Book of Mormon. The series is popular among many Latter-day Saint (The Church of Jesus Christ of Latter-day Saints) families. Its principle creators were Aaron Edson, Dennis Agle and Kenneth Agle, with Edson composing the music, Dennis Agle writing the screenplays, Edson and Dennis Agle as directors, and Kenneth Agle as producer.

== Intended audience ==
According to the Liken website, "If you're concerned about what is going on in today's mainstream media, we think you'll like what you find here at Liken", because "we don't believe "family friendly" means it has to be boring." Further, "you'll find movies and music that will not only entertain your family, but uplift and inspire them as well."

== Reception ==
According to LDS Cinema Online, which reviews films from a Latter-day Saint perspective, "if you’re looking for spiritually challenging, deeply insightful cinema for adults, Liken is far from your ideal. Neither is any of these films a paragon of cinematic technique, acting, comedic or musical performance, etc. The films have their weaknesses to be sure", but "whatever the case, the filmmakers have gotten something right. It’s a formula that catches kids’ attention and causes them to remember what they see".

A Herald Extra writer wrote "From the beginning, the “Liken” films have been noted for their energetic, catchy music, which is a major element of “Jonah and the Great Fish."

== Characters ==
Characters are listed by movie release order. A full cast list is not included.

=== Dreamers ===
- Spencer
- Amelia
- Devon
- Chloe

=== Story Tellers ===
- Spencer's Primary teacher.
- Spencer's brother.
- Amelia's Parents.
- George (Butler to Amelia's family and later as Devon's Grandfather)
- Amelia's choir teacher.
- Missionaries
- Chloe's Father.

=== Main characters ===
- Nephi
- Ammon
- David
- Alma
- Mary, Joseph, and Jesus This is a Nativity Story.
- Esther
- Daniel
- Samuel the Lamanite
- Jonah

== Episodes ==
Release Dates

=== Old Testament ===
Title	"Dreamer"	Story Teller	Protagonists	Antagonists	Songs	Release date
David and Goliath	Ameila	Ameila’s teacher	David	Goliath	I’m Gonna Be King, The Lord Sees What’s Inside, It’s Not That Easy Being King, Give Me Just One Chance, I am David, The Lord Sees What’s Inside (Reprise), I Am Goliath, The Lord Is My Shepherd, One Smooth Stone, I Used To Be Like You, One Little Light, Is He The One	2005-03
Esther and the King	Amelia	Amelia's Mother	Esther, Mordecai, King Ahasuerus, Most Servants	Haman, Haman’s Wife, Some Servants	There Is News, What More Could A King Want, Can You Love Me, Together, It’s Great To Be The King To Be, What Would I Give, A Little Bit More, Grateful, Can You Love Me (Reprise), There Is News (Finale)	2006-03
Daniel and the Lions	Devon (First Appearance)	George (Devon's Grandfather)	Daniel, King Darius, Angel, Servants, Lions	Other Presidents, Lions	I Need Professional Help, You Can’t Keep A Good Man Down, Because Of Thee, Give Us A Break, Meat’s on the Menu Tonight, What Have I Done, Victory, Peace, I’m A Vegetarian Now, Because of Thee (Reprise)	2006-09
Jonah and the Great Fish	Chloe (First Appearance)	Chloe's Father (First Appearance)	Jonah, The Great Fish, Small Fish	Jonah, Sharks, Ninevites	Whose Side Are You On?, Night of Nineveh, No Way, The Great Deep Blue, A Place Where I Belong, Because of You, Stout-Hearted Mariners, Thou Hast Brought Me Up, I'll Obey, A Heart That's Open	2011-11

=== New Testament ===
Title	"Dreamer"	Story Teller	Protagonists	Antagonists	Songs	Release date
The First Christmas	Amelia	Amelia's Parents	Angel Gabriel, Mary, Joseph, Jesus, Wisemen	???	Joy to the World, Everything We Need, A Hand To Hold, Blessed (Mary), The Handmaid of the Lord, My Soul Doth Magnify The Lord, Blessed (Joseph), A Hand To Hold (Reprise), A Place For Him, Glory To God, He’s Born, Finale	2005-11

=== Book of Mormon ===
Title	"Dreamer"	Story Teller	Protagonists	Antagonists	Songs	Release date
Nephi And Laban	Spencer Anderson (First Appearance)	Spencer's Primary Teacher (First Appearance)	Nephi, Lehi, Sam, Sarah	Laban, Laman, Lemuel	Life Could Not Be Better, His Arms Around You, I Love My Things, Here Waiting, Thy Arms Around Me (plus a Reprise & Ballad)	2003-09
Ammon and Lamoni	Spencer Anderson	McKay Anderson (First Appearance)	Ammon, Abish, Lamoni, Servants	Lamanite Robbers (Off-Screen), Brother of Robber’s Leader	This Light / It’s Always Been this Way, A Mighty Change of Heart, I Know That I Must Change / A Mighty Change of Heart (Duet), We Are Dead, We’re Alive, Uprising, Finale	2004-09
Alma and King Noah's Court	Amelia (First Appearance), Spencer (Offscreen)	McKay Anderson (Missionary) & Companion (Not Speaking Part)	Alma, Abinadi	King Noah, Wicked Priests	Just Say Yes (Performed & a Capella), Something More, We Are The Best / Turn Unto The Lord, It’s All Right, Turn Unto The Lord (Reprise), Turn Unto The Lord (2nd Reprise) / He Must Die, All He Asks Me / Something More (Reprise), Something More (2nd Reprise), All He Asks Me (Reprise), All He Asks Me (Finale).	2005-09
Samuel the Lamanite	Amelia	George (Amelia’s Butler)	Samuel, Nephi, Lehi, Misc. People	School’s Superintendent, N.A.C., Misc. People	All’s Well in Zion, Lonely, The N.A.C., Look to the Light, His Love, Another Year, Enough, The Time Has Come, His Love (Reprise)	2006-09

== Notable Cast ==
Name	Occupation	Best Known	Movie	Character
Alex Boyé	Actor/Singer	* Private Perry in Saints and Soldiers: The Void * Heavenly Host in Saturday's Warrior * Singer specializing in both LDS music and popular songs (with an African twist)	David and Goliath	Abinidab
Thurl Bailey	Public Speaker/Broadcast Analyst/Actor/Singer	* NBA player for the Utah Jazz (1983-1991; 1999) and the Minnesota Timberwolves (1991-1994)	David and Goliath	Goliath
Summer Naomi Smart	Actress	* Kerra McConnell in Passage to Zarahemla	Esther and the King	Esther
Larry Bagby	Actor/Musician	* Ernie/"Ice" in Hocus Pocus * Marshall Grant in Walk the Line	Nephi and Laban	Laman
Kaycee Stroh	Actress/Singer/Dancer	* Martha Cox in High School Musical, High School Musical 2, and High School Musical 3: Senior Year	Ammon and Lamoni	Dancer
Brady Bluhm	Actor	* Billy in 4C in Dumb and Dumber and Dumb and Dumber To * Christopher Robin in three Winnie the Pooh films (1997-1999)	Alma and King Noah's Court	Elder Johansen (non-speaking role)
Dallyn Vail Bayles	Actor/Singer	* Hyrum Smith in Joseph Smith: Prophet of the Restoration * Hyrum Smith in Emma Smith: My Story	Alma and King Noah's Court The First Christmas Esther and the King	Alma Joseph King Ahasuerus
Casey Elliot	Singer/Actor	•Member of Gentri music group	Daniel and The Lion's Den	Daniel
