= Robert Schuyler (professor) =

American archaeologist, anthropologist

Robert L. Schuyler

Education
- Education: University of Arizona; University of California, Santa Barbara

Robert L. Schuyler is an American historical archaeologist and Anthropologist. He is now professor emeritus (Anthropology) and Curator Emeritus (Historical Archaeology), University of Pennsylvania, Philadelphia, Pennsylvania.

== Work ==
=== Definition ===
He has been an advocate of Historical Archaeology being housed under the broader field of Anthropology rather than the discipline of History. This recognizes the interplay of human biology and culture, with culture being primary. A complete Historical Archaeology draws equally on the archaeological record and written sources, sometimes with secondary sources coming from oral history and ethnography. These views are well presented in his edited volume Historical Archaeology: A Guide to Substantive and Theoretical Contributions (1978) and several published articles, such as “The Written Word, the Spoken Word, Observed Behavior” (1977); “Archaeological Remains, Documents and Anthropology” (1988); “Comments on ‘Historical Archaeology in the Next Millennium: A Forum” (1999); “Historical Archaeology” (2001)

=== Globalization ===
Schuyler views the Modern World as the first truly global cultural system (eventually incorporating all peoples, all nations, and all societies) and spatial system but also as a social system. It covers all groups (ethnic, religious and national) ranging from ruling classes to workers and slaves. The basic building blocks of the Modern World are civilizations (both in the Eastern Hemisphere and the Western Hemisphere) and tribal societies ranging from simple hunter-gatherers, through agricultural-pastoral peoples, to complex but pre-civilization societies. These are all cultural statements with no direct relationship to human biology.

He has worked on African American sites, Native American historic sites and fully industrialized urban sites. Politically this approach is expressed in “Images of America: The Contribution of Historical Archaeology to National Identity” (1976).

=== Field projects ===
His two major continuing projects, involving excavations and archival research, are Silver Reef (a mining town in southwest Utah, 1876–1896) and the agricultural-industrial community of Vineland, New Jersey (1875 to the present); the latter project has involved hundreds of University of Pennsylvania undergraduates and received a Dean's Award for Innovation in Teaching. See “The South Jersey Project: Historical Archaeology in the Largest City in New Jersey.” (2011)
