= Summer Naomi Smart =

American actress and singer (born 1982)

- Born: September 9, 1982 (age 43); Salt Lake City, Utah, United States
- Occupation: Actress
- Years active: 2006-present
- Spouse: Ray Interior

Summer Naomi Smart (also known under the name Summer Naomi) is an American actress and singer. Smart has won two Joseph Jefferson Awards, one in 2008 and one in 2009.

== Early life ==
Smart grew up in Salt Lake City as the youngest of seven girls and began acting while in middle school. After graduating from Hillcrest High School in Midvale, Utah, she worked as a musical entertainment performer at Lagoon Park in Farmington, Utah while attending Brigham Young University. Smart graduated from BYU in 2005 with a BFA in Music, Dance, and Theatre and during her stay there she participated in the university's Young Ambassadors program.

== Awards ==
- Joseph Jefferson Award (2008) for Sweet Charity
- Joseph Jefferson Award (2009) for "Actress in a Supporting Role" for The Light in the Piazza

== Filmography ==
=== Film ===
Year	Title	Role	Notes
2018	The Christmas Apron	Diane	Short
2014	Chicago P.D.	Greta	1 episode
2014	Chicago Fire	Greta	1 episode
2011	Good Luck Charlie, It's Christmas!	Flight Attendant #1	Disney Channel Original Movie
2007	Passage to Zarahemla	Kerra McConnell	Movie (Lead Role)
2007	Belle and the Beast: A Christian Romance	Belle Watson	Movie (Lead Role) [credited as Stephanie Wood]
2006	Liken: Esther and the King	Esther	Movie (Lead Role)

== Stage productions ==
- Aida (2006) as Amneris
- Wicked (2007-2008) as Nessarose
- Hollywood Sings (2006-2007) Ensemble Member
- Sweet Charity (2008) as Charity Hope Valentine
- The Full Monty (2008) as Pam Lukowski
- Noises Off (2008) as Brooke Ashton
- Camelot (2009) as Green Boy
- A Christmas Carol (2009) Ensemble
- The Light in the Piazza (2009) as Clara Johnson
- Ragtime (2010) as Ensemble, Evelyn Nesbit
- Hot Mikado (2010) as Yum-Yum
- For the Boys (2011) as Margaret, Luanna Trott, Myra u/s
- Seussical as Bird Girl
- Legally Blonde (2012) as Shandi, Brooke Wyndham
- Hero the Musical (2012) as Adele
- Sleeping Beauty (2012) as Princess Amber
- My One and Only (2012) as Edythe Herbert
- Barnum (2013) as Jenny Lind
- Seussical as Mrs. Mayor
- Shrek the Musical (2013) as Princess Fiona
- Mary Poppins as Mary Poppins (2013-2014)
- Cats (2014) as Bombalurina
- The Beverly Hillbillies: The Musical (2014) as Elly May
- Women on the Verge of a Nervous Breakdown (2014) as Candela
- Anything Goes (2015) as Hope Harcourt
- City of Angels (2015)
