= Scott Young (American football) =

American football player (born 1981)

No. 71, 79
- Position: Guard

Personal information
- Born: July 15, 1981 (age 45); Salt Lake City, Utah, U.S.
- Listed height: 6 ft 4 in (1.93 m)
- Listed weight: 312 lb (142 kg)

Career information
- High school: Hillcrest (Midvale)
- College: BYU
- NFL draft: 2005: 5th round, 172nd overall pick

Career history
- Philadelphia Eagles (2005–2007); Cleveland Browns (2008); Denver Broncos (2009)*
- * Offseason or practice squad member only

Awards and highlights
- Second-team All-MW (2004)

Career NFL statistics
- Games played: 14
- Stats at Pro Football Reference

Scott Lewis Young (born July 15, 1981) is an American former professional football player who was a guard in the National Football League (NFL). He played college football for the BYU Cougars and was selected by the Philadelphia Eagles in the fifth round of the 2005 NFL draft.

Young also played for the Cleveland Browns and Denver Broncos.

== Early life ==
Young attended Hillcrest High School in Midvale, Utah, and was a three-year letterman in football. He is the son of a police officer and an elementary school teacher. According to The Philadelphia Inquirer Young is an Eagle Scout with 64 merit badges.

== College career ==
Young was a two-year starter at Dixie State College (when it was still a junior college), and led Dixie with 15.5 sacks as a sophomore. He transferred to Brigham Young in 2002. At BYU, he switched from defense to offense and had one season as a full-time starter, earning All-MWC Second Team honors at guard in 2004. During this time, he was noted to be the strongest football player in the conference, with a maximum bench press of 540 pounds.

== Professional career ==
Projected to be a third-round selection, Young was listed as the No. 8 offensive guard prospect in the 2005 NFL draft by Sports Illustrated. At the 2005 NFL Scouting Combine, he had 43 repetitions of the 225-pound bench press, setting a record at that time, and beating the second-best total that year by 8 repetitions. As of 2018, Young is one of only 17 prospects to repeat more than 40 lifts at the 225-pound (102 kg) bench press at the national combine since 1999. While noted for his upper body strength, his lack of a "dominant base" was criticized by NFL scouts.

Pre-draft measurables
Height	Weight	40-yard dash	10-yard split	20-yard split	20-yard shuttle	Three-cone drill	Vertical jump	Broad jump	Bench press
6 ft 3 5/8 in (1.92 m)	312 lb (142 kg)	5.06 s	1.81 s	2.98 s	4.37 s	7.48 s	35 in (0.89 m)	9 ft 7 in (2.92 m)	43 reps
All values from NFL Combine

Young announced his retirement from the NFL on Thursday, April 16, 2009, a month after signing with the Broncos.
