= Wells Fargo and Company Express Building =

Coordinates: 37°15′11″N 113°22′0″W

- U.S. National Register of Historic Places
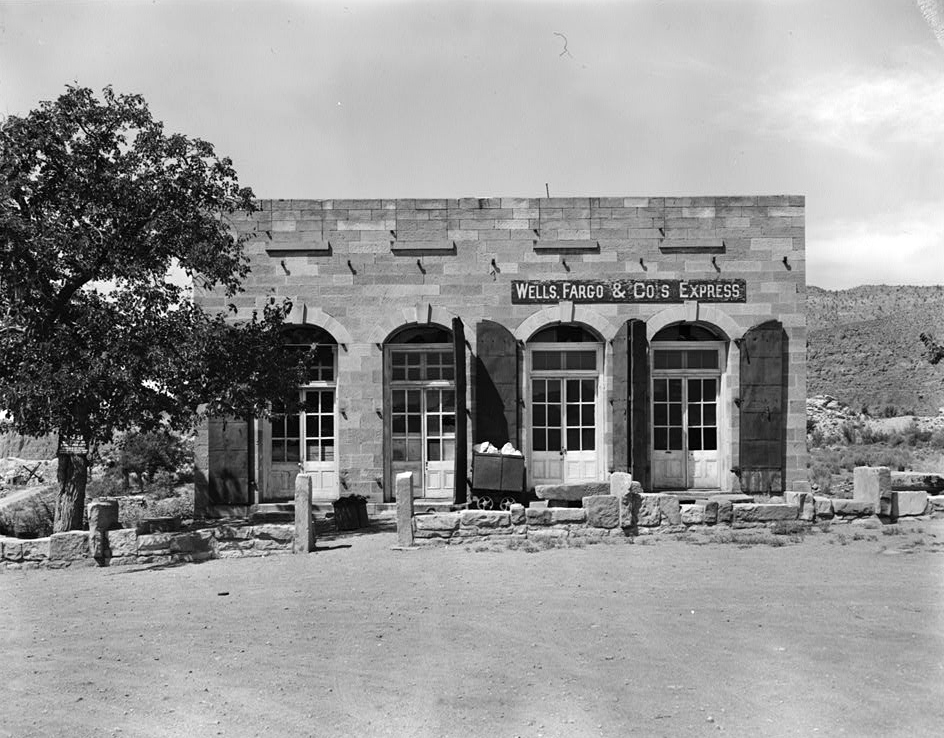
- Wells Fargo Building in 1968

- Location within Utah Location within the United States
- Location: Main Street{br>Silver Reef, Utah; United States
- Area: 0.2 acres (0.081 ha)
- Built: 1877
- NRHP reference No.: 71000861
- Added to NRHP: March 11, 1971

The Wells Fargo and Company Express Building is a historic commercial building in the ghost town of Silver Reef, Utah, United States, that is listed on the National Register of Historic Places.

== Description ==
The structure was built circa 1877 and is one of three surviving structures in Silver Reef. The building housed the offices of the Wells Fargo Company. The structure was built by local masons George Brooks and Ira McMullin of local red sandstone, with finished ashlar masonry by Brooks in the front and coursed rubble stone by McMullin on the other three sides. A parapet surrounds the single-slope roof on the front and sides. The main level is divided into two equal-sized rooms, each with two front entrances and a rear entrance, with a vault on one side. The basement does not connect to the upper levels. It was used as a stable. The Wells Fargo building was used as a mine supply store in the late 19th century, then for a time as the residence of the Colbath family. Its last use was as offices for the Western Gold and Uranium Company, who added a rear porch structure. The building is owned by Washington County.

The building was placed on the National Register of Historic Places on March 11, 1971. It has been restored and is operated as a museum by Washington County as part of the Wells Fargo Silver Reef Monument.

== See also ==
- National Register of Historic Places listings in Washington County, Utah
