= Hillcrest High School (Midvale, Utah) =

Public school in Utah, United States

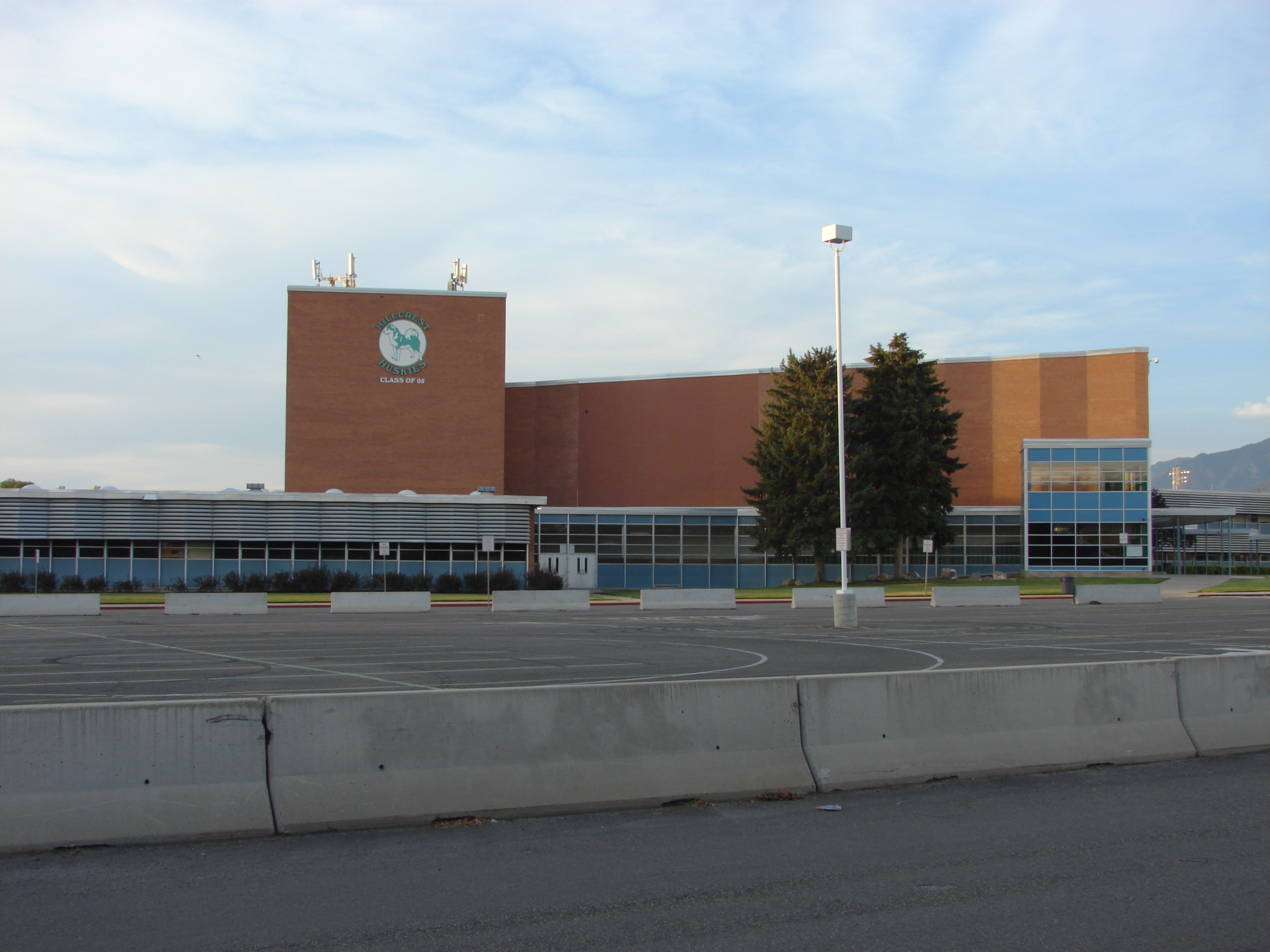

Location
- 7350 S. 900 East; Midvale, Utah, US; 40°37′5″N 112°52′10″W

Information
- Type: Public
- Established: 1962
- School district: Canyons School District
- Principal: Brenda McCann
- Staff: 98.41 (on an FTE basis)
- Grades: 9–12
- Enrollment: 2,421 (2024–2025)
- Student to teacher ratio: 24.60
- Colors: Green and White
- Athletics: Basketball, baseball, track, cross country, tennis, volleyball, drill team, wrestling, football, cheerleading, soccer, and softball
- Athletics conference: UHSAA 5A Region 4
- Team name: Huskies
- Website: Official website

Hillcrest High School is a public high school located in Midvale, Utah, United States. Hillcrest High School is the only school in the Canyons School District that offers the International Baccalaureate Program, and one of only four high schools in the valley to do so - the others being Highland High School West High School and Skyline High School.

== History ==
Hillcrest High School opened its doors to students in the fall of 1962 as the third operating high school in the Jordan School District at the time. It is located on a 38-acre (150,000 m^{2}) site approximately 12 miles (19 km) south of Salt Lake City. The school's football stadium lights were relocated from the old Bingham High School in Copperton, Utah. Hillcrest underwent a construction job where they unveiled a new building in 2018.

== UHSAA Athletics/Activities ==
=== Activities ===
- Theatre: 2012, 2013, 2015, 2016, 2018, 2021, 2023, 2024, 2025, and 2026

=== Boys ===
- Basketball: 1968 and 1980
- Baseball: 1980, 1981, 1982, and 1983
- Cross country: 1972 and 1980
- Tennis: 1990
- Track: 1981, 1982, 1983, and 1986

=== Girls ===
- Basketball: 1976, 1979, 1982, and 1983
- Cross country: 1982
- Drill team: 1999, 2001, 2002, 2003, 2008, 2009, 2016, 2024, and 2025
- Gymnastics: 1985, 1988, and 1989
- Tennis: 2003 and 2004
- Track: 1974, 1975, 1982, and 1983
- Volleyball: 1973 and 1975

== Notable alumni ==
- Hal Hale (1964) - American Basketball Association player
- Pete Van Valkenburg (1968) - NFL running back
- Richard Dutcher (1982) - actor
- Al van der Beek (1991) - musician, The Piano Guys
- Andy Bowers (1994) - NFL defensive end
- Corbin Allred (1998) - actor
- Scott Young (1999) - NFL offensive guard
- Josh Savage (1999) - NFL defensive end
- Summer Naomi Smart (2000) - actress
- Mary Elizabeth Winstead (2003) - actress
- Zane Beadles (2005) - NFL Pro Bowl offensive guard
- Katie Ann Powell (2016) - Miss District of Columbia winner
