= Harrisburg, Utah =

Harrisburg
- Ghost town
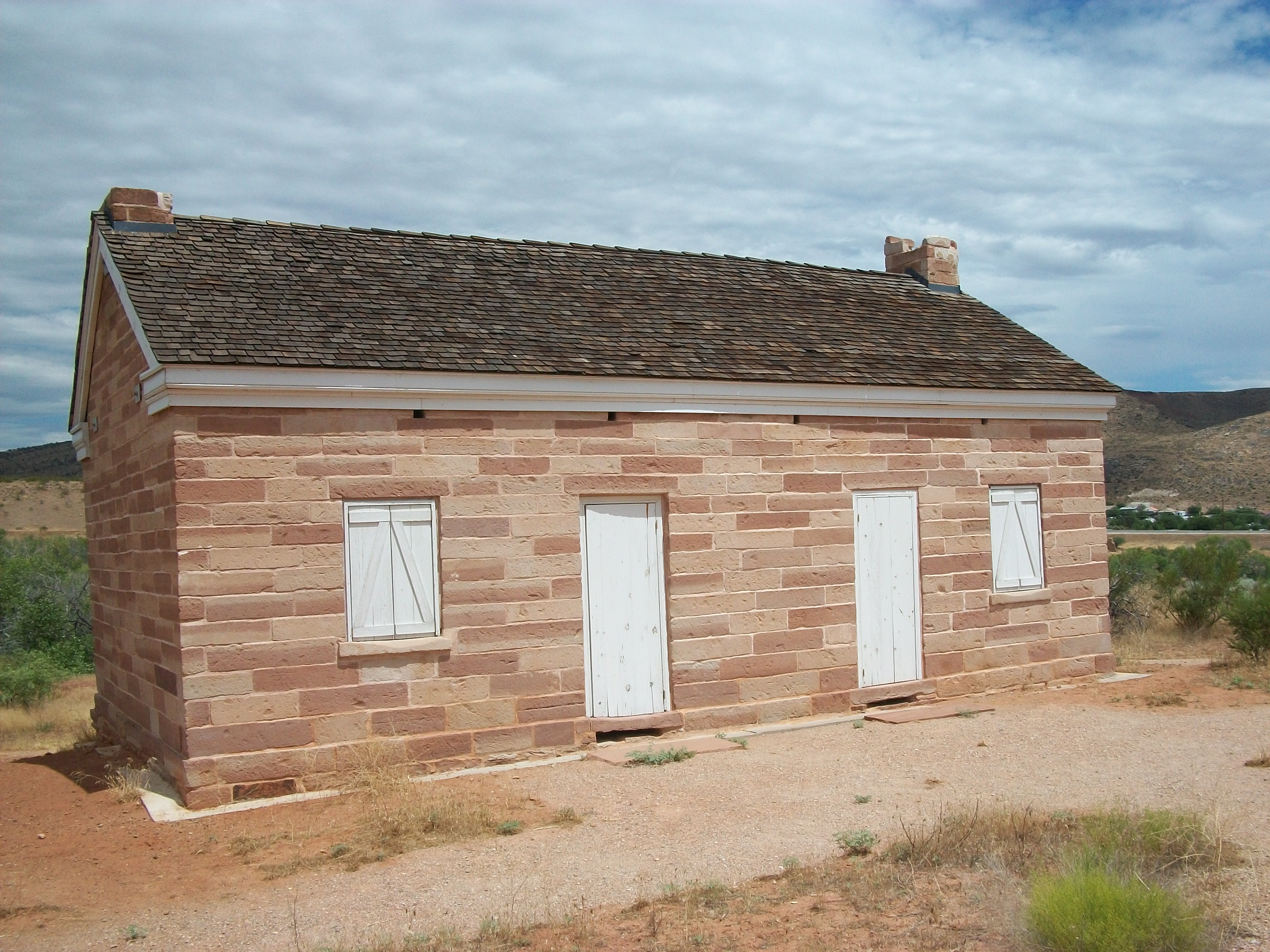
- The Orson Adams home in Harrisburg

- Location within Utah Location within the United States
- Coordinates: 37°12′21″N 113°23′40″W
- Country: United States
- State: Utah
- County: Washington
- Founded: 1859
- Abandoned: 1895
- Named for: Moses Harris
- Elevation: 2,995 ft (913 m)
- GNIS feature ID: 1437583

Harrisburg is a ghost town in Washington County, Utah, United States. Established as Harrisville in 1859, the town was flooded by the Virgin River in 1862, causing the residents to move farther up Quail Creek. Soon after, the town's name was changed to Harrisburg. By 1868, 200 people lived in Harrisburg; however, over the course of the next few years, floods, Native American raids, and a grasshopper plague caused people to relocate to the nearby towns of Leeds and Silver Reef. By 1895, Harrisburg was abandoned. Presently, the site of Harrisburg is occupied by a real estate project called Harrisburg Estates, but many remnants from its old days are still visible throughout town including the historic cemetery and several sandstone houses. The neighborhood now lies within the legal boundaries of Hurricane.

== History ==
In 1859, Moses Harris, who had previously established a Mormon colony near San Bernardino, moved into the area that was to become Harrisburg and established a town near where Quail Creek flowed into the Virgin River. Several families settled in the town, which had recently been named Harrisville. When the Virgin River flooded Harrisville in 1862, the town's residents relocated further up Quail Creek and renamed the town Harrisburg, after Moses Harris. Many of the buildings were constructed of stone because of the abundance of rocks in the area. Fences that signified the boundaries of homes were also constructed of stone. The school, however, was made of cedar posts that were inserted into the ground. The roof was constructed of cedar logs and cedar bark held together with soil. By 1864, there were 128 people living in Harrisburg. Between 1875 and 1888, the nearby mining town of Silver Reef purchased many agricultural goods from Harrisburg, which created a cash market.

In 1868, Harrisburg's population was 200; however, a year later, a grasshopper plague and a Navajo raiding party caused a few residents to leave. Drought also caused many residents to leave Harrisburg. Most of the residents that left moved to the nearby settlements of Leeds and Silver Reef. By 1892, only six families lived in Harrisburg, and by 1895, Harrisburg was abandoned.

== Current status ==
In the 2010s, Harrisburg became a residential neighborhood in a development called "Harrisburg Estates". Recreational vehicle and mobile home parks bracket the residences.

Numerous stone houses and foundations remain of historic Harrisburg. Among the remaining buildings is the Orson Adams House. Constructed in 1864, the two-room stone building was occupied by Orson B. Adams, his wife, two sons, and two granddaughters. John Kemple stayed in the Orson Adams House on his way to Nevada to mine silver. Kemple is credited as the person who discovered the silver in the area that was to become the silver mining town of Silver Reef. After Orson Adams died, the property changed owners several times. When it was purchased by William Emett in 1910, he and his family lived in the Orson Adams House until Emett's death in 1945. In 2001, the Bureau of Land Management acquired the Orson Adams House property and restored it.

== See also ==
- List of ghost towns in Utah
