= Leeds, Utah =

Town in Washington County, Utah

- Town
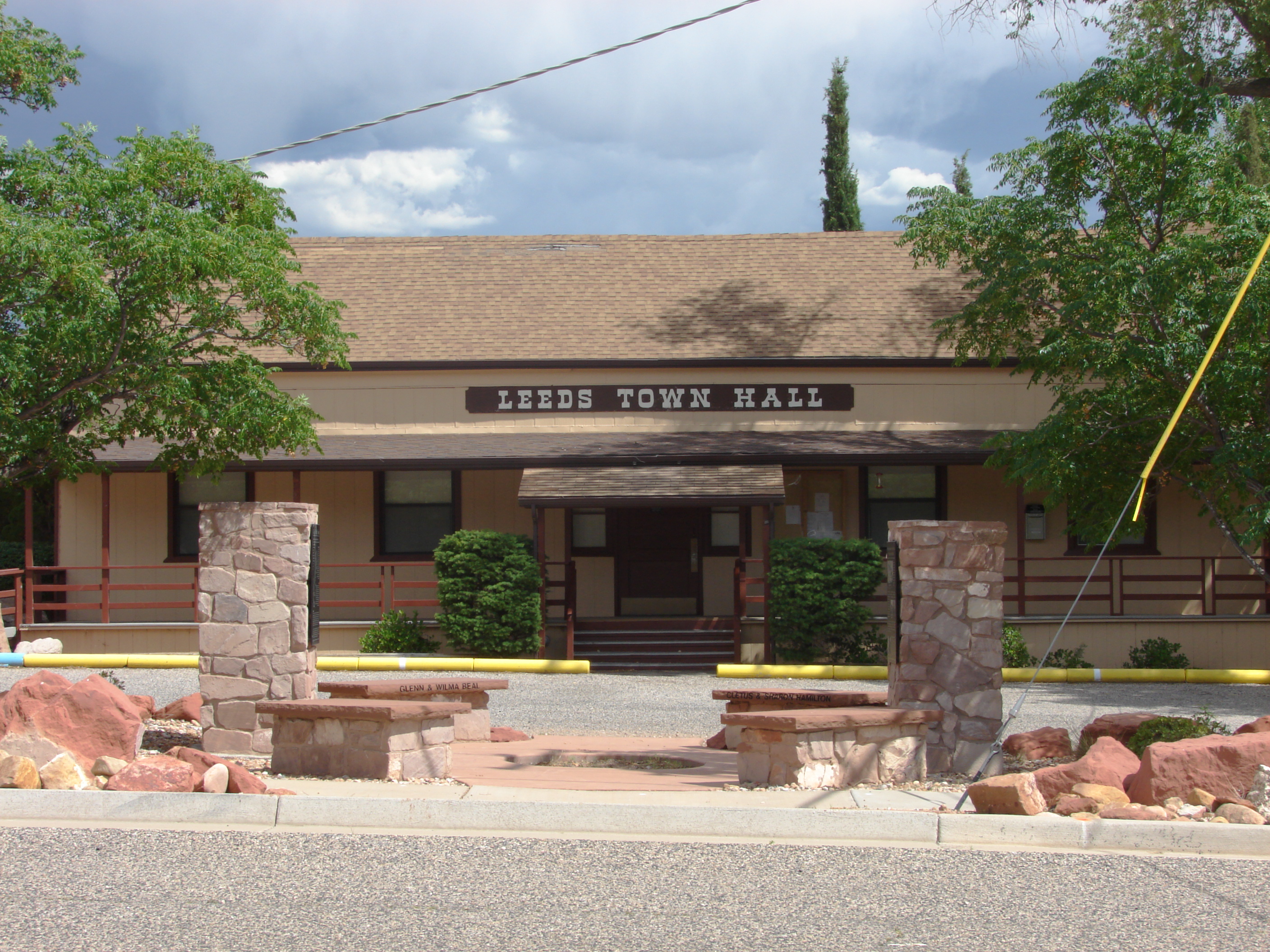
- Leeds Town Hall

- Location in Washington County and the state of Utah
- Coordinates: 37°14′22″N 113°20′49″W
- Country: United States
- State: Utah
- County: Washington
- Settled: 1867
- Named for: Leeds, England

Area
  - Total: 6.29 sq mi (16.30 km^{2})
  - Land: 6.29 sq mi (16.30 km^{2})
  - Water: 0 sq mi (0.00 km^{2})
- Elevation: 3,504 ft (1,068 m)

Population (2020)
  - Total: 864
  - Density: 138.7/sq mi (53.54/km^{2})
- Time zone: UTC-7 (Mountain (MST))
  - Summer (DST): UTC-6 (MDT)
- ZIP code: 84746
- Area code: 435
- FIPS code: 49-44100
- GNIS feature ID: 2412887
- Website: leeds.utah.gov

Leeds is a town in Washington County, Utah, United States. The population was 864 at the 2020 census.

== History ==
Formerly known as Bennington, Leeds was formed due to flooding in the neighboring town of Harrisburg. The residents in the flood-affected areas decided to move to this area in 1867. It was renamed in honor of Leeds in England, the origin of many of its settlers. In recent years, the city's proximity to the ghost town of Silver Reef, the Pine Valley Mountains, and Zion National Park have changed the local economic base from agriculture to tourism.

On June 17, 2009, Utah police and forest rangers destroyed about 8,750 marijuana plants growing in Washington County. Law enforcement reported Mexican cartels have moved their growing operations to Utah to avoid the U.S.-Mexico border and police pressure in California. There were no arrests made and the marijuana fields were in the Pine Valley Mountains near Leeds. Doug Roe, a special agent with the United States Forest Service, said the plants were young and not ready for harvesting.

== Geography ==
According to the United States Census Bureau, the town has a total area of 2.0 square miles (5.2 km^{2}), all land. The Red Cliffs Desert Reserve borders the town.

=== Climate ===
According to the Köppen Climate Classification system, Leeds has a semi-arid climate, abbreviated "BSk" (Tropical and Subtropical Steppe Climate) on climate maps.

== Demographics ==
Historical population
Census	Pop.	Note	%±
1890	223		—
1900	248		11.2%
1910	148		−40.3%
1920	211		42.6%
1930	220		4.3%
1940	268		21.8%
1950	166		−38.1%
1960	109		−34.3%
1970	151		38.5%
1980	218		44.4%
1990	254		16.5%
2000	547		115.4%
2010	820		49.9%
2020	864		5.4%
U.S. Decennial Census

As of the census of 2000, there were 547 people, 207 households, and 157 families residing in the town. The population density was 267.7 people per square mile (103.5/km^{2}). There were 240 housing units at an average density of 117.4 per square mile (45.4/km^{2}). The racial makeup of the town was 94.15% White, 0.73% Native American, 0.18% Asian, 1.10% Pacific Islander, 2.01% from other races, and 1.83% from two or more races. Hispanic or Latino of any race were 2.93% of the population.

There were 207 households, out of which 25.1% had children under the age of 18 living with them, 67.6% were married couples living together, 5.3% had a female householder with no husband present, and 23.7% were non-families. 21.7% of all households were made up of individuals, and 10.6% had someone living alone who was 65 years of age or older. The average household size was 2.64 and the average family size was 3.04.

In the town, the population was spread out, with 26.0% under the age of 18, 6.0% from 18 to 24, 22.1% from 25 to 44, 23.0% from 45 to 64, and 22.9% who were 65 years of age or older. The median age was 42 years. For every 100 females, there were 98.2 males. For every 100 females age 18 and over, there were 100.5 males.

The median income for a household in the town was $41,250, and the median income for a family was $42,500. Males had a median income of $34,375 versus $19,688 for females. The per capita income for the town was $17,568. About 4.0% of families and 5.8% of the population were below the poverty line, including 1.6% of those under age 18 and 3.8% of those age 65 or over.

== See also ==
- List of cities and towns in Utah
- Dixie National Forest
- Pine Valley Mountain Wilderness
- Passage to Zarahemla, children's film set in Leeds
