= Passage to Zarahemla =

- Directed by: Chris Heimerdinger
- Written by: Chris Heimerdinger
- Produced by: Brian Brough and Chris Heimerdinger
- Starring: Summer Naomi Smart; Moronai Kanekoa; Brian Kary; Seth Packard; Alex Petrovitch; Bryce Chamberlain; Spencer King; Jose Bacio; Jenny Latimer
- Music by: Sam Cardon
- Release date: October 15, 2007
- Running time: 90 minutes
- Country: United States
- Language: English

Passage to Zarahemla is an adventure film directed and written by Chris Heimerdinger. It tells the story of a young pair of siblings seeking to find a new life following the abrupt death of their mother. Their exploits lead them to a relative's home in Utah and eventually a thrilling confrontation with their past and the merger of time. It is based partly on Book of Mormon people, including the Zarahemla of the title.

This movie is based on the novel by the same name, originally published by Heimerdinger Entertainment in November 2003. The movie version of Passage to Zarahemla, was released to theaters October 15, 2007. Originally intended only as a film, the working title of this film was "Summer of the Nephite", but after unsuccessful attempts to gain backing for its production, the title was reworked and released in novel form as Passage to Zarahemla.

The film ranked 4th overall in Utah the first week of its release. According to BoxOfficeMojo in December 2008, the film ranked 47th on the all-time highest gross box office for a Christian film and 69th for "Fantasy – Live Action".

The film was released to DVD in June 2008.

== Overview ==
Kerra (nicknamed "Sakura" by her father) and Brock McConnell are orphans on the run. To keep from being separated by state authorities, Kerra flees to the only relative she remembers from her earliest childhood - an aunt and uncle who are members of the Church of Jesus Christ of Latter-day Saints and live near a wondrous place in the woods where parallel realities collide and where an ancient people called Nephites cross paths with the residents of a sleepy Utah town.

== Plot ==
The story begins with its focus on a group of hunters illegally hunting game out in the woods. Originally thought to be dead, the hunter's target springs back to life and flees into the heavy brush and trees. Determined not to let the game suffer, one of the hunters decides to pursue the elk in its flight. After some amount of exploration he finds his elk...hanging over a branch, shot by an arrow. Hearing noises he turns around to an arrow shot at him and screams.

Kerra and Brock are introduced to the story line at their mother's funeral. With their father having apparently disappeared for some unknown reason years ago, their mother recently dying, and no other known relatives within the area, the two are set to become wards of the state. In an effort to keep the two together, Kerra decides that they must pack up their belongings and escape before the return of the social worker assigned to their case. Brock, having prior association with a local gang and a criminal record, assists his sister in stealing the social worker's vehicle. The two drive off in a fury in an effort to escape.

Remembering a relative from early on in her childhood, Kerra plots a course for Leeds, Utah, a small LDS rich community in the southern part of the state. Arriving at their aunt and uncle's house, the two concoct a story indicating that they are traveling across the country to meet up with their mother who had recently acquired a new place of employment. With the stolen car having problems, the pair is unable to travel any further until it is fixed, and are offered a place to stay until repairs are completed.

Shortly after their arrival, Kerra is confronted by her cousins with stories from her early childhood days. These stories recall "strange noises" in the woods behind their house and dealings with an "imaginary" being whom Kerra had termed to be "Kid Donni." One night after the siblings arrival, an earthquake shakes the area with the epicenter believed to be near the property of their Aunt Corrine and Uncle Drew.

Following the quake, Kerra is reunited with her "imaginary" childhood friend Kiddoni, who is in reality a noted being from the Book of Mormon. The earthquake is revealed to have caused a "rift" in time - allowing Kerra contact with the ancient Nephite peoples and their adversaries, and allowing Kiddoni and his people to cross the time gap into the modern world.

As the story progresses, the time portal gap expands and eventually allows the Nephite and Gadianton armies to exit the past near the Whitman's home. Brock on the other hand is unaware of this time rift and eventually finds himself captured by the Gadianton armies. It is at this time that he comes into contact with a scraggly-bearded individual from "modern" times named Chris.

Meanwhile, during their escape from California, Brock had been given a bag by a former gang-member to take out of the area, which is later revealed to be a bag full of illegal drugs. Upon realizing who was in possession of the bag, the gang leader decides to make a trip to the small Utah community to recover the bag.

Near the end of the story the two worlds clash as the rift in time grows very large. The Gadianton army crosses the time border into the present day in an effort to find food for their armies. Through sheer coincidence Chris and Brock reunite with Kerra near the Whitman home, where it is revealed that Chris is the siblings father, who had disappeared during a hunting trip many years earlier. A major Nephite-Gadianton battle eventually ensues near the Whitman home while the trio of family retreats into hiding. Shortly thereafter, another quake hits the area and the division between the time periods is restored. Kerra is heartbroken at not getting to say goodbye to her Nephite friend, but both families are happy that they were kept safe and that father and children were reunited again.

== Cast ==
- Summer Naomi Smart as Kerra McConnell
- Moronai Kanekoa as Kiddoni
- Brian Kary as Brock McConnell
- Jan Felt as Aunt Corrine
- Seth Packard as Spree
- Alex Petrovitch as Hitch
- Bryce Chamberlain as Grandpa Lee
- Spencer King as Lobo
- Jose Bacio as Adder
- Jenny Latimer as Natasha

== Soundtrack ==
The soundtrack is titled Whispered Visions and is a compilation of songs with music and lyrics by Chris Heimerdinger

#	Title	Performer(s)
1	"Fly Free"	Chris Heimerdinger, Katherine Nelson Thompson
2	"Whispered Visions"	Katherine Nelson Thompson, Chris Heimerdinger
3	"Simple Fellow"	Chris Heimerdinger, Donre Sampson
4	"Sons of Fire"	Chris Heimerdinger, Alex Boye, Jared Haddock, Michael Sorenson
5	"The Way I Feel Inside"	Chris Heimerdinger, Kenneth Cope, Barry Gibbons, Jim Funk, Lori Gibbons, Felicia Sorenson, Katherine Nelson Thompson, Jessie Clark Funk, Tanya Barkdull, Jared Haddock, Daniel Beck
6	"Good Vs. Evil"	Chris Heimerdinger
7	"BYU Security Police"	Chris Heimerdinger, Jessie Clark Funk, Tonya Barkdull
8	"Finally"	Chris Heimerdinger, Jessie Clark Funk
9	"Savior, Redeemer"	Chris Heimerdinger

== Reception ==
Critic Sean P. Means of The Salt Lake Tribute gave the film 2.5 stars out of 4. He wrote that Heimerdinger made "a few rookie mistakes" in his debut as a film director, but also "squeezes a lot of visual flair from a minuscule budget" and effectively balances entertaining filmmaking with the religious beliefs that inspired the movie.

”But the pacing is pretty sluggish, and Heimerdinger can't coax much from his cast, aside from some stiff performances. (Kary's conniving Brock is particularly irritating and unlikable.)”, commented a review in Deseret News. A review at Dove.org was of the exact opposite opinion and praised those very aspects of the film.

Meridian Magazine considers that the film is a Mormon movie.
