= Chris Heimerdinger =

American author (born 1963)

- Born: August 26, 1963 (age 63); Bloomington, Indiana, U.S.
- Education: Brigham Young University
- Occupation: Author
- Writing career
- Notable work: Tennis Shoes Adventure Series

Chris Heimerdinger (born August 26, 1963) is an American author who has written twenty novels for adults and young adults, most famously the Tennis Shoes Adventure Series. He is a member of the Church of Jesus Christ of Latter-day Saints (LDS Church), and most of his stories center on religious themes familiar to Latter-day Saints.

== Early life ==
Heimerdinger was born in Bloomington, Indiana. His father was a professor in theatre at Indiana University. His parents divorced when he was four years old and his mother remarried. Heimerdinger has one older brother and two younger sisters.

Heimerdinger excelled in Wyoming High School competitions for three years in the categories of Humor, Oratory, and Drama. He began to write books at the age of 7, and continued through high school. He also began making super-8 films beginning in junior high, and showed these films to the scholarship committee of Brigham Young University in 1981, earning a full scholarship in 'Theatre and Cinematic Arts' after receiving a Sundance Institute 'Most Promising Filmmaker' award for his film Night Meeting.

Heimerdinger read the Book of Mormon at age 18, during his first semester at college, and was baptized into the Church of Jesus Christ of Latter-day Saints on October 10, 1981.

== Books and films ==
Heimerdinger is the author of the Tennis Shoes Adventure Series. His first published work was Tennis Shoes Among the Nephites (1989), based on events in the Book of Mormon. Thus far thirteen books have followed in the series, the first of which features three children who discover a secret cave capable of transporting its visitors back in time. The following books continue with the original characters as they go to college, get married, and have kids. The characters also have to deal with death, parenting troubles and time travel. The first books in the series were intended to be a fictional account of the Book of Mormon, while later ones explore other historical eras, including Ancient Rome, Israel during the Roman destruction in A.D. 73, and the time period of the Tower of Babel. The last five novels in this series include research notes at the end of each chapter. In 2014, Heimerdinger released the 12th book in the series, "Drums of Desolation", which involves the final battle between the Nephites and the Lamanites from the Book of Mormon.

In 2005, Heimerdinger began production of the film Passage to Zarahemla. Originally written in 1999 as a screenplay entitled "Summer of the Nephite" it was published as a novel, Passage to Zarahemla in 2003. The film was released to cinemas in October 2007 and as of 2011 ranks in the top 150 for both Christian and Fantasy Live-Action films. It was released on DVD in June 2008. In August 2011, a book sequel to Passage to Zarahemla, entitled Escape From Zarahemla was released by Covenant Communications, Inc. A self-published novel, Muckwhip's Guide to Capturing the Latter-day Soul, was released as an ebook in November 2012 and as a paperback in December 2012.

In 2008, Heimerdinger was among the top 10 list of LDS authors as chosen by Mormon Times readers.

== Public service ==
Heimerdinger utilizes the title of his Tennis Shoes Adventure Series in helping around the world. In August 2005 Heimerdinger joined with Hearts and Hands for Humanity in American Fork, Utah to help collect tennis shoes for children 5 to 12 years old.

In 2007, Heimerdinger again joined with Hearts and Hands for Humanity to collect tennis shoes. This time it was in honor of a dead soldier, Nathan Barnes, of American Fork, Utah. The goal this time was to collect and send thousands of tennis shoes to Iraq.

== Works ==
=== Novels ===
Tennis Shoes Adventure Series

1. Tennis Shoes Among the Nephites, 1989 (republished 1999), Covenant Communications, ISBN 1-57734-467-7
2. Gadiantons and the Silver Sword, 1990, Covenant Communications, ISBN 1-55503-390-3
3. Tennis Shoes and the Feathered Serpent, part one, 1995, Covenant Communications, ISBN 1-57734-487-1
4. Tennis Shoes and the Feathered Serpent, part two, 1996, Covenant Communications, ISBN 1-57734-489-8
5. The Sacred Quest (formerly Tennis Shoes and the Seven Churches), 1997, Covenant Communications, ISBN 1-57734-491-X
6. The Lost Scrolls, 1998, Covenant Communications, ISBN 1-57734-418-9
7. The Golden Crown, 1999, Covenant Communications, ISBN 1-57734-498-7
8. Warriors of Cumorah, 2001, Covenant Communications, ISBN 1-57734-922-9
9. Tower of Thunder, 2003, Covenant Communications, ISBN 1-59156-177-9
10. Kingdoms and Conquerors, 2005, Covenant Communications, ISBN 1-59156-740-8
11. Sorcerers and Seers, 2010, Covenant Communications, ISBN 1-60861-087-X
12. Drums of Desolation, 2014, Covenant Communications, ISBN 1-62108-821-9
13. Thorns of Glory (Part 1), 2020, Covenant Communications, ISBN 1-52441-478-6

Other books

- The Absurd Adventures of Elders Kurds and Way, (also Kurds and Way, A Missionary Epic), 1987, Heimerbooks
- Eddie Fantastic, 1992, Covenant Communications, ISBN 1-55503-403-9
- Daniel and Nephi, 1993, Covenant Communications, ISBN 1-55503-566-3
- Ben Franklin and the Chamber of Time, 1995, Deseret Book Company, ISBN 0-87579-878-0
- A Light in the Storm, 2000, Covenant Communications, ISBN 1-57734-684-X
- Passage to Zarahemla, 2003, Heimerdinger Entertainment and Covenant Communications, ISBN 0-9708343-0-6
- A Return to Christmas, 1996, multiple publishers, ISBN 0-8041-1826-4
- Escape From Zarahemla (October 2011, Covenant Communications)
- Muckwhip's Guide to Capturing the Latter-day Soul (December 2012, Heimerdinger Entertainment, ISBN 978-0-9708343-4-8)

=== Music CDs ===
- Whispered Visions—Original Songs From the Motion Picture Passage to Zarahemla

=== Films ===
- The Wolves (1987): Drama about a grade-school boy's club. Produced, written, and directed by Heimerdinger while a student at Brigham Young University. Distributed by Phoenix Films, BFA.
- Lehi's Land of First Inheritance (2003): Documentary on Book of Mormon geography produced by Newlight Productions, Written by Chris Heimerdinger and Joseph Allen. Directed by Chris Heimerdinger (Dist. by Newlight Prod. and Sounds of Zion, Inc.) ASIN: B000N3WAFM
- Passage to Zarahemla (2007), a feature-length action/adventure/fantasy movie based on the Heimerdinger book of the same name. The movie version was written and directed by Heimerdinger and was released to theaters October 15, 2007.

== See also ==
- LDS fiction
