= Tennis Shoes Adventure Series =

Novel series by Chris Heimerdinger

The Tennis Shoes Adventure Series is a series of LDS fiction novels written by Chris Heimerdinger. They are most widely read by young adult members of the Church of Jesus Christ of Latter-day Saints.

== Titles ==
There are thirteen books in the series so far, with the fourteenth anticipated to be released in the near future:

1. Tennis Shoes among the Nephites (1989)
2. Gadiantons and the Silver Sword (1991)
3. The Feathered Serpent, Part One (1995)
4. The Feathered Serpent, Part Two (1996)
5. The Sacred Quest (formerly Tennis Shoes and the Seven Churches) (1997)
6. The Lost Scrolls (1998)
7. The Golden Crown (1999)
8. Warriors of Cumorah (2001)
9. Tower of Thunder (2003)
10. Kingdoms and Conquerors (2005)
11. Sorcerers and Seers (2010)
12. Drums of Desolation (2014)
13. Thorns of Glory: Part 1 (2020)
14. Thorns of Glory: Part 2 (TBD)

== General synopses ==
The main characters of the series are Jim Hawkins, his sister Jenny Hawkins and Garth Plimpton, and later, their family members and friends. The novels involve people from modern times being transported to the past (at various times and locations described in the Standard Works) by means of a cave in Wyoming called "Frost Cave" (a real cave on the Spirit Mountain in Cody, Wyoming) in the United States. They feature both Book of Mormon and Bible themes.

The first four books feature Jim Hawkins as the main character: first as a teenager, then as a young man in college, and in the third and fourth as a father of three children.

- In book 1, Jim, his friend, Garth, and his younger sister, Jennifer, discover a time passage and spend two months in the time of the Nephites, at the time of Helaman and Captain Teancum around 67 B.C.
- In book 2 (Gadiantons and the Silver Sword), a few inhabitants of Book of Mormon times travel to the present day in search of an evil sword, the Sword of Coriantimur, an infamous sword that continuously pops up in the lives of the family, throughout many of the books. It ends with Jim destroying it, in modern times.
- Books 3 and 4 are two parts of the same story, when Jim Hawkins’ 16-year-old daughter, Melody, is kidnapped and Jim takes his other two children, Steffanie and Harry, with him to early first-century Book of Mormon times to rescue her. They are caught in the maelstrom of the Savior's death, while in the Americas and are there to witness Jesus Christ's coming to the people of the Americas after his resurrection. These are also the first books in the series to be written in somebody besides Jim's point of view. The 3rd and 4th books are written in dual person, about half in Jim's point of view and the rest in Melody's point of view.
- Books 5–7 are another multi-part story, in which many members of Jim Hawkins' now-large family visit the land of Israel in late first-century Biblical times.

- Book 5 (The Sacred Quest) starts with Harry setting off with his step sister-to-be, Meagan, to Ancient Roman times to find Marcos, Melody's true love, and bring him back to her. They find and save the only existing copy of the Book of Matthew.
- Book 6 (The Lost Scrolls) has Harry and Meagan finding more "Lost Scrolls" and saving them from the evil sorcerer, Simon Magus, who wants to destroy the sacred books.
- Book 7 (The Golden Crown) Harry gets stranded on a Greek island in 73 A.D., with Micah, but get off with the help of a fisherman. While Harry and Gidgiddonihah are trying to save Jesse and Mary from Epigonus, an evil Greek councilman, Gid is killed. Meagan and Garth take Apollus to the present day, and come back with Jim, Sabrina, and Steffanie to find Harry and meet John the Beloved and Mary, the mother of Jesus. They all go home.

- Books 8, 9, 10, 11 and 12 involve fourth-century Nephite settings, and book 9 (Tower of Thunder), the early-Biblical time of Abraham and Noah (close to 3000 B.C.)

- Book 8 (Warriors of Cumorah) starts with Todd Finlay, a man who tried to kill Jim and Garth back in book 2, kidnapping Josh and Becky, to use as leverage. Apollus, Meagan, Ryan, Mary, and eventually, Becky, dash through the caves after Todd and Josh. Apollus, Ryan, and Meagan get sent close to end of the world of the Nephites. Mary, Josh, and Becky get sent to Israel in 1841. It ends with Harry, fresh off his mission. Harry, Marcos, Garth, and Jim all set out to find everyone else. Jim goes back to protect Sabrina, Melody, Jenny, and the little kids, while, Marcos and Garth go to the same era as Apollus, Meagan and Ryan. Harry, as he's about to go by himself, meets up with his sister, Steffanie, and they go to Ancient Biblical times to find everyone.
- Book 9 (Tower of Thunder) Mary, Rebecca, and Joshua find themselves in the time of the Tower of Babel. They find the baby Abram, whom evil King Nimrod is trying to kill. They also carry the sword of Akish, and Joshua becomes attached to it. They safely deliver Abram to Melchezedik in Salem, and meet Noah. Harry and Steffanie are captured by Prince Mardon and considered angels from the city of Enoch. Harry manages to escape and changes time by saving the life of Gidgiddonihah. He brings back Gidgiddonihah, Micah, and Jesse to save Steffanie. They witness the destruction of the tower and find Mary and Pagag, the son of Mahonri Moriancumr, who has strong feelings for Mary. Joshua has run off with the sword of Akish, and Rebecca has gone after him. They appear to see Rebecca struck down by the swords power, and Akish use the sword to cut a hole in time which he takes Joshua and himself through. Rebecca is brought back to life through priesthood power.
- Book 10 (Kingdoms and Conquers) Meagan, Apollus, Ryan, and their Nephite companions travel towards Cumorah. They are betrayed by Lamanai and Tz'ikin's father. Harry, Mary, Steffanie, Pagag, Rebecca, Gidgiddonihah, Micah, and Jesse arrive in the same time period as the others. They are attacked and Harry, Mary, Becky, Gid, Micah, and Jesse are taken prisoner by Wolf Witches. Steffanie and Pagag are left to find them. The Wolf Witches and Tz'ikin's tribe make Apollus and Gid fight to the death wearing costumes, so they don't know they are fighting each other. Harry and Mary stop the fight, and they both get out alive. Jim and Jenny are in Jerusalem during the life of the Savior. Joshua is a captain of the Nephite army. He is given a special job from Mormon to move the Golden Plates. His dad and Marcos accompany him.
- Book 11 (Sorcerers and Seers) Joshua, Marcos, and his father are attacked by Akish. Akish steals the Gold Plates, and Joshua pursues him with Marcos. They meet Akish's wife and her family, who are fighting against Akish. The people must flee and Joshua and Hamira (Akish's daughter) are separated from the rest of the group. Hamira paints a mural above a cave, which is the same mural found by Garth in book one. The other group are attacked by Gadianton Ghosts and Micah is killed. Jesse and Pagag are on also on the verge of death. Meagan is blinded by an acid powder. They finally arrive at Cumorah, and are reunited with Garth. Jesse and Pagag recover and Steffanie confesses her love to Pagag. The Gadianton Ghosts return and try to finish Meagan. Ryan manages to save her, but travels through time with the Gadianton. He ends up home in the Salt Lake Valley. Pagag is also transported with a Gadianton back to his homeland. He vows to return to find Steffanie. Jenny and Jim stay with the Savior's family. Jim sees his son, Gid in Jerusalem. He inadvertently gives Judas Iscariot the idea to the betray the Savior. He meets Hamira, who says that Joshua is in trouble and that someone has his wife and baby Gid.

- Book 12 (Drums of Desolation)

- Books 13 & 14 involve both fourth-century Nephite settings, and first century Judean settings.

- Book 13 (Thorns of Glory, part 1)

- Book 14 (Thorns of Glory, part 2) TBD

== Characters ==
=== Protagonists ===
- Jamie "Jim" Hawkins: Father of Melody, Steffanie, and Harrison. Best friend of Garth Plimpton, known among the Nephites as "Jimhawkins". Brother of Jenny, and original character from Tennis Shoes Among the Nephites.
- Renae Fenimore Hawkins: Wife of Jim, introduced in book 2 and deceased as of Book 3. Mother of Melody, Steffanie and Harrison. Died from ovarian cancer
- Garth Plimpton: Friend of Jim, known among the Nephites as "Garplimpton". Husband of Jennifer, original character. Father of Rebecca and Joshua.
- Jennifer "Jenny" Hawkins Plimpton: Sister of Jim, wife of Garth, original character and mother of Rebecca and Joshua.
- Melody Constance Hawkins Sanchez: Oldest child of Jim, wife of Marcos. Ovarian cancer survivor, adopted mother of Carter.
- Marcos Alberto Sanchez: Husband of Melody, son of Jacob of the Moon, convert to the Church of Jesus Christ of Latter-day Saints. Adopted father of Carter, killed Ashira (Akish's queen/wife), saved the heir to the throne of King Omer.
- Carter Sanchez: Adopted son of Melody and Marcos.
- Steffanie Hawkins: Second child of Jim. In love with Pagag.
- Pagag*: Son of the Mahonri Moriancumer [Brother of Jared], in love with Steffanie. Is sent back to Jaredite times after the Gadianton Ghosts try to attack Meagan, gives up the throne.
- Harrison "Harry" Hawkins: son of Jim, has the gift to use the Seer Stone, is a falconer and swordsmen. He was once stranded on a mediterranean island in the Roman Empire after his ship crashed. He learns how to fight and is a leader and return missionary. He also has love interest in Mary Symeon
- Mary Symeon: Grand-niece of Jesus Christ. Betrothed to Harry Hawkins.
- Sabrina (Sorenson) Hawkins: Wife of Jim [after Renae's death], is introduced in book 3, mother of Meagan from a previous marriage, mother of Gidgiddonihah.
- Gidgiddonihah "Baby Gid" Teancum Hawkins: Son of Jim and Sabrina
- Meagan Sorenson: Daughter of Sabrina from a previous marriage. Main character since book 5.
- Apollus Brutus Severillus: Fiancé of Meagan, first introduced in book 6, Centurion of the 5th Legion of Rome, goes to modern day with Garth and Meagan in book 8, leaves to go to Mexico and comes back after he realizes there is danger, fights in a Nephite Gladitorial Contest against Gidgiddoniah, because both were tricked into it, heals people with the priesthood with Ryan, proposes to Meagan, is included in the delegate to go to the top of Cumorah.
- Joshua "Josh" Plimpton: Son of Garth and Jennifer, Chief Captain of a portion of the Nephite Army. In love with Hamira.
- Rebecca "Becky" Plimpton: Daughters of Garth and Jennifer, has the gift to use the Seer Stone.
- Gidgiddonihah: Old Nephite warrior, veteran of Gadianton Wars, head of the Big Group, namesake of "Baby Gid." Dies while rescuing Mary and Jesse in book 7. In book 9, Harry goes back in time and saves his life.
- Jesse: Jewish [from 70 A.D.], Micah and he are like brothers, orphan, adopted by Symeon but is once again orphaned when Symeon is crucified. Goes to Nephite lands and is trained by Gidgiggoniah, adopted brother of Mary, like a little brother to Harry and the rest.
- Micah: Jewish [Assine, from 70 A.D.], Harry's best friend, goes to Nephite lands and is trained by Gidgiddoniah. Jesse and he are like brothers; dies from a poisoned-tipped arrow from a Gadianton Ghost.
- Ryan Champion: Meagan's ex-boyfriend, falls in love with Tz'ikin, gets sent back to modern day time after the Gadianton Ghosts try to attack Meagan and Becky.
- Jacobah: Ryan's bodyguard, assigned to him by Prince Lamanai, convert to Christianity, breaks his leg helping Ryan and is healed, warns Ryan about losing the memories of his experiences.
- Tz'ikin: Lamanite assassin, killed by her father while trying to save Meagan.
- Captain Teancum*
- Captain Moroni*
- Hamira: Female Jaredite warrior. Youngest daughter of Akish and Asherah. Granddaughter of King Jared. Great-granddaughter of King Omer. Sister to Nimrah. In love with Joshua.
- Ammonchi: Banner chief of the Fox Division of the Nephite Army, under the command of Captain Josh.
- Anna: Second-oldest half-sister of Jesus Christ.

=== Antagonists ===
- Amalickiah*
- Todd Finlay: Obsessed with Coriantimur's Sword, kidnaps Rebecca and Joshua at Lagoon. Killed by Akish.
- Mehrukenah: Gadinaton Assassin
- Jacob* (of the Moon)
- Kumarcaah
- Simon Magus*
- Epigonus†
- Nimrod*
- Mardon†: Son of King Nimrod
- Akish*: Sorcerer among the Jaredites who conspired to reinstall King Jared to the throne. Later had Jared murdered and usurped the throne. Since book 8: Warriors of Cumorah, Akish has pursued the Silver Sword. Akish created the weapon via sorcery and believes that it will help him to defeat his enemies. Killed by Joshua Plimpton.
- Agath: Brother of Akish, the Jaredite sorcerer. Loyal follower and commander in his army.
- Avram: Captain of the guard in the house of Caiphas, the high priest.
- Antionum: Lamanite warrior from the village of Sielbalche, participated in the rescue of Moroni and Gigal in book 8 (Warriors of Cumorah).
- Spearthrower Owl†
- Fireborn†
- Prince Lamanai/Prince Eagle Sky Jaguar
- Nimrah: Son of Akish
- Chief Judge Zenephi*
- Gadianton Ghosts: Assassins that blinded Meagan & killed Micah.
- Annas or Ananus: First high priest of the Sanhedrin over the newly formed province of Judea in AD 6.
- Quinn: Melody's ex-boyfriend, sold her out to save his own life.

* People from LDS Church standard works who appear in the series.
† Characters based on other historical records.

== Thorns of Glory and Zarahemla books ==
In an interview included in The Passage to Zarahemla DVD, Heimerdinger said that volume 11 would likely be published in 2009 and would be called Thorns of Glory.

In an announcement published on his official blog on November 22, 2009, however, Heimerdinger said that because of the complexities involved with the book he is currently writing, there will likely be two more volumes in the current adventure. Heimerdinger said that tentative plans are for book 11 (Sorcerers and Seers) to be published in early fall in 2010, with volume 12 (more appropriately named Thorns of Glory) to be published 6–12 months after book 11.

Later in his official blog, Heimerdinger said that he had submitted the draft to his publisher, and he didn't know how far into the editing process they are. He did say, however, that "as of now the publisher's plan is to release the book this fall — September, if I understood them correctly. Things can change, but as of now, that's the intent."

In even later blog posts, Heimerdinger stated that the story had gotten even more complex and would culminate in combining the Tennis Shoes Adventure Series with his Passage to Zarahemla series. The volume uniting the two series was Passage's sequel, Escape From Zarahemla. Future Heimernovels will serve as sequels to both series.

In 2013, Heimerdinger posted that "For months I've told fans that the new Tennis Shoes book would be called Thorns of Glory. Most know that this book is long enough that my publisher will likely divide it into two books. I've presumed it would be Thorns of Glory Part 1 and Thorns of Glory Part 2, sort of like the Feathered Serpent books. HOWEVER, I think I've come up with a better title for the first of these 2 books: Drums of Desolation. Let me know what you think. Just know that Book 13 is likely still called Thorns of Glory."

Subsequent posts confirmed that Drums of Desolation would indeed be the title of the next book. It was released on October 1, 2014, though an option to pre-order from Heimerdinger himself was immediately available.

There was a period of 6 years between Book 12, and Book 13. In a 2020 podcast, Chris says he hadn't started writing the Book 14 yet but that he wants to release it much faster.
