= The Illusionist (Mason novel) =

- Author: Anita Mason
- Language: English
- Publication date: 1983

The Illusionist is a 1983 novel written by English author Anita Mason. The novel follows the story of Simon Magus, mentioned in Acts of the Apostles (8:9-24) as a magician, set in the first years of the Christian Church. It follows Magus' quest for power through magic, and contrasts that the power struggles between the apostles Paul, Peter and James who each have a different vision of what Jesus had stood for, and wish their perspective to dominate the Christian church.

== Plot ==
The novel is set in the Holy Land some years after the death of Christ. Its principal character is Simon Magus, a magician forced to live on his wits who travels from town to town, accompanied by his slave-boy Demetrius. In one town he encounters a sect whose members have the ability to heal, but whose philosophy infuriates him. Intrigued by the sect, he accepts baptism but, after a dispute with their leader, Kepha (Saint Peter), he finds he can no longer work his magic. He abandons Demetrius, and lives as a beggar. After befriending a prostitute named Helen, he develops a dualist philosophy based upon sex and transgression of the law. He begins his performances of magic again, and eventually travels to Rome, where he is obliged to perform before Nero in competition with Kepha.

== Reception ==
=== Awards ===
Nominated for the Man Booker Prize for Best Novel in 1983.

=== Reviews ===
The Kirkus review says the plot is not gripping, but "the characters do embody some of the diverse spiritual currents of the era in a clear and lively fashion"
