= Road signs in East Germany =

Direction signs in Dresden in 1988.

The road signs of the German Democratic Republic includes the distinct system of traffic signs, signals, and road markings used in the country from its establishment in 1949 until the German reunification in 1990. While initially inheriting the pre-World War II German traffic code, East Germany developed its own independent Road Traffic Regulations (Straßenverkehrs-Ordnung, or StVO) in 1956. The system went through a major overhaul between 1974 and 1978 to align with the international standards of the Vienna Convention on Road Signs and Signals.

Despite international standardization, East German signage retained unique aesthetic and design choices that set it apart from its West German counterpart. Most notable was the use of GIL, a customized sans-serif typeface heavily based on Gill Sans, which was characterized by extremely tight spacing between letters. The country's traffic infrastructure also led to the introduction of the Ampelmännchen (little traffic light man), which was a stylized pedestrian signal created in 1961 by traffic psychologist Karl Peglau.

Following the dissolution of the GDR in 1990, East German road signs were systematically replaced with West German equivalents. However, the Ampelmännchen survived due to widespread public nostalgia, and remains an iconic cultural symbol across modern Germany today.

== (1949-1956) ==
=== Warning signs ===
Danger

Uneven road

Series of bends

Crossroads

Railway crossing with gates

Railway crossing without gates

Countdown marker to railway crossing without gates

Countdown marker to railway crossing with gates

Countdown marker (100 metres)

Countdown marker (50 metres)

=== Regulatory signs ===
No vehicles

No entry

No motor vehicles (except motorcycles)

No motorcycles

No motor vehicles (except motorcycles) during weekends and public holidays

No motorcycles during weekends and public holidays

Bicycle path

Maximum weight limit

Maximum width limit

Maximum height limit

Maximum speed limit

No stopping

No parking

Turn right

Proceed straight ahead

Turn right ahead

Proceed straight ahead, or turn right

One-way street

Customs

Give way

Stop

Taxi stand for 6 cabs

=== Information signs ===
Parking

Caution

First aid point

Street lighting not in use throughout the night

Over-voltage street lighting not in use throughout the night

Start of urban area

End of urban area

Direction sign for highways

Direction sign

Direction sign for unpaved roads

Highway number

Ring road for long-distance traffic

Advance direction sign

Priority road

Detour

== (1956-1964) ==
=== Warning signs ===
Danger

Uneven road

Series of bends

Crossroads

Steep descent

Slippery road

Road narrows on both sides

Pedestrian crossing

Roadworks

Children

Railway crossing with gates

Railway crossing without gates

Countdown marker to railway crossing with gates

Countdown marker to railway crossing without gates

Countdown marker (100 metres)

Countdown marker (50 metres)

Single track railway crossing

Single track railway crossing (with light)

Multi track railway crossing

=== Prohibitory signs ===
No vehicles

No through traffic

Play street

No entry

No motor vehicles (except motorcycles)

No motorcycles

No motor vehicles

No motor vehicles (except motorcycles) during weekends and public holidays

No motorcycles during weekends and public holidays

No bicycles

No bicycles during weekends and public holidays

No animal-drawn vehicles

No parking

No stopping

Maximum width limit

Maximum height limit

Maximum weight limit

Maximum speed limit

End of speed limit

No overtaking

Give way

Give way to trams

Stop

Customs

=== Mandatory signs ===
One-way street

Proceed straight ahead

Turn right

Turn right ahead

Proceed straight ahead, or turn right

Turn left

Turn left ahead

Proceed straight ahead, or turn left

Turn left or right

Roundabout

Bicycle path

Footpath

Parking

Caution

First aid point or hospital

=== Information signs ===
Priority road

End of priority road

Start of expressway

End of expressway

Highway number

Direction sign for highways

Direction sign

Direction sign for unpaved roads

Start of urban area

End of urban area

Advance direction sign

Detour scheme

Detour

== (1964-1971) ==
=== Warning signs ===
Danger

Uneven road

Crossroad with priority

Crossroads

Right bend

Left bend

Right double bend

Left double bend

Steep descent

Slippery road

Road narrows on both sides

Pedestrian crossing

Roadworks

Low-flying aircraft

Children

Wild animals

Railway crossing with gates

Railway crossing without gates

Countdown marker to railway crossing with gates

Countdown marker to railway crossing without gates

Countdown marker (100 metres)

Countdown marker (50 metres)

Single track railway crossing

Single track railway crossing (electrified line)

Single track railway crossing (with light)

Multi track railway crossing

=== Prohibitory signs ===
No vehicles

No through traffic

Play street

No entry

No motor vehicles (except motorcycles)

No motorcycles

No motor vehicles

No bicycles

No bicycles during weekends and public holidays

No motor vehicles (except motorcycles) during weekends and public holidays

No motorcycles during weekends and public holidays

No animal-drawn vehicles

No left turn

No right turn

No parking

No stopping

Maximum width limit

Maximum height limit

Maximum weight limit

Maximum axle weight limit

Maximum speed limit

End of speed restrictions

No overtaking (Note: The sign is drawn incorrectly, and the car colors are mixed up.)

End of no overtaking

No honking

Give way

Give way to trams

Stop

Customs

=== Mandatory signs ===
One-way street

Turn left

Roundabout

Bicycle path

Footpath

Parking

Taxi stand for 10 cabs

Parking arrangement: perpendicular to the direction of travel

Parking arrangement: angled to the direction of travel

Parking arrangement: fully on the footway

Parking arrangement: partially on the footway

Parking arrangement: fully on the footway, and perpendicular to the direction of travel

Parking arrangement: partially on the footway, and perpendicular to the direction of travel

Caution

Get in lane

=== Information signs ===
First aid point or hospital

Public telephone

Vehicle repair station

Petrol station

Priority road

Priority road direction

Start of expressway

End of expressway

Highway number

Direction sign for highways

Direction sign

Direction sign for motorway

Direction sign for through traffic

Direction sign for unpaved roads

Start of urban area

End of urban area

Advance direction sign

Detour scheme

Detour

== (1971-1979) ==
=== Warning signs ===
Danger

Uneven road

Crossroad with priority

Right bend

Left bend

Right double bend

Left double bend

Steep descent

Slippery road

Road narrows

Pedestrian crossing

Roadworks

Low-flying aircraft

Children

Wild animals

Traffic lights ahead

Railway crossing with gates

Railway crossing without gates

Countdown marker (150 metres)

Countdown marker (100 metres)

Countdown marker (50 metres)

Single track railway crossing

Single track railway crossing (electrified line)

Single track railway crossing (with light)

Multi track railway crossing

=== Prohibitory signs ===
No vehicles

No through traffic

Play street

No entry

No motor vehicles (except motorcycles)

No motorcycles

No motorcycles during weekends and public holidays

No motor vehicles

No motor vehicles during weekends and public holidays

No bicycles

No bicycles during weekends and public holidays

No motor vehicles (except motorcycles) during weekends and public holidays

No animal-drawn vehicles

No left turn

No right turn

No U-turn

No parking

No stopping

Maximum width limit

Maximum height limit

Maximum weight limit

Maximum axle weight limit

Maximum speed limit

End of maximum speed limit

No overtaking

End of no overtaking

No honking

End of all restrictions

Give way

Give way to trams

Stop

Customs

=== Mandatory signs ===
One-way street

Turn left

Two-way traffic

Turn left or right

Turn left ahead

Turn right ahead

Proceed straight ahead, or turn right

Proceed straight ahead, or turn left

Roundabout

Bicycle path

Footpath

Pedestrian underpass

Minimum speed limit

End of minimum speed limit

Parking

Taxi stand for 10 cabs

Parking arrangement: perpendicular to the direction of travel

Parking arrangement: at an angle to the direction of travel

Parking arrangement: fully on the footway

Parking arrangement: partially on the footway

Parking arrangement: fully on the footway, and perpendicular to the direction of travel

Parking arrangement: partially on the footway, and perpendicular to the direction of travel

Parking arrangement: fully on the roadway, and parallel to the direction of travel

Caution

Get in lane

Advance direction sign indicating the route to a road with restricted access

=== Information signs ===
First aid point or hospital

Public telephone

Vehicle repair station

Petrol station

Campsite

Priority road

Priority road direction

Start of expressway

End of expressway

Highway number

Direction sign for highways

Direction sign

Direction sign for motorway

Direction sign for through traffic

Direction sign for unpaved roads

Start of urban area

End of urban area

Advance direction sign

Advance direction sign for specific lanes

Start of motorway

End of motorway

Advance direction sign on motorway

Direction sign on motorway

Advance sign for motorway exit

Motorway exit countdown marker (300 metres)

Motorway exit countdown marker (200 metres)

Motorway exit countdown marker (100 metres)

Detour scheme

Detour

Detour direction (proceed straight ahead)

Detour direction (turn right)

Detour direction (turn left)

Chevron delineator

=== Additional signs ===
Pedestrians keep left

Pedestrians to use the opposite footway

Start

End

Risk of black ice

Telephone number

Winding road for 4000 metres

Three consecutive dangers

Distance to the object

Grit

Loose chippings

Bicycle crossing

Deaf people

Time restriction

Direction (left)

At an altitude of 800 metres

Unsupervised parking for 18 cars

Exit (straight ahead)

Vehicle type (truck)

Vehicle type (bus)

Vehicle type (car)

Vehicle type (motorcycle)

Tram in oncoming traffic

Tram crossing

Faling rocks

Surveying

Except bicycles

Except Volkspolizei vehicles

Except fire service vehicles

Except power plant vehicles

Except scheduled buses

Except taxis

Except construction vehicles

Except ambulances

Except company vehicles

Except service vehicles

Frost damage

== (1979-1990) ==
=== Warning signs ===
Danger

Uneven road

Crossroad with priority

Crossroads

Traffic lights ahead

Right bend

Left bend

Right double bend

Left double bend

Steep descent

Steep ascent

Crosswinds

Slippery road

Road narrows on both sides

Road narrows on the right

Road narrows on the left

Two-way traffic

Roadworks

Loose chippings

Falling rocks

Pedestrian crossing ahead

Children

Wild animals

Domesticated animals

Low-flying aircraft

Bicycle crossing

Tram crossing

Railway crossing without gates

Railway crossing with gates

Countdown marker (150 metres)

Countdown marker (100 metres)

Countdown marker (50 metres)

Railway crossing

Railway crossing (with light)

Railway crossing (electrified line)

=== Regulatory signs ===
No vehicles

No entry

No motor vehicles (except motorcycles)

No motorcycles

No motor vehicles

No trucks

No agricultural vehicles

No vehicles with trailer

No bicycles

No animal-drawn vehicles

Maximum width limit

Maximum height limit

Maximum weight limit

Maximum axle weight limit

No U-turn

No honking

Minimum distance limit

Maximum speed limit

No overtaking

No overtaking by goods vehicles

End of all restrictions

End of maximum speed limit

End of no overtaking

No stopping

No parking

Stop

Give way

Customs

Give way to oncoming traffic

Minimum speed limit

End of minimum speed limit

Snow chains mandatory

Proceed straight ahead

Turn right

Turn left

Turn right ahead

Turn left ahead

Proceed straight ahead, or turn right

Proceed straight ahead, or turn left

Turn left or right

Proceed straight ahead, or perform a U-turn

Advance direction sign indicating the route to a road with restricted access

Keep right

Keep left

One-way street (turn right)

One-way street (turn left)

One-way street

Get in lane

Reduction in the number of traffic lanes in 200 metres

Increase in the number of traffic lanes in 200 metres

Bus stop

Tram stop

Pedestrian crossing

Pedestrian underpass

Pedestrian overpass

Pedestrian detour: use opposite side of the street (left)

Pedestrian detour: use opposite side of the street (right)

Footpath

Bicycle path

Parking

Unattended parking lot for 18 cars

Reserved parking

Taxi stand for 10 cabs

Parking with time limit; use only with parking disc.

Parking arrangement: perpendicular to the direction of travel

Parking arrangement: angled to the direction of travel

Parking arrangement: fully on the footway

Parking arrangement: partially on the footway

Parking arrangement: fully on the footway, and perpendicular to the direction of travel

Parking arrangement: partially on the footway, and perpendicular to the direction of travel.

Parking arrangement: on the roadway, parallel to the direction of travel.

No parking zone

Speed limit zone

End of no parking zone

End of speed limit zone

=== Information signs ===
Priority road

End of priority road

European route number

Highway number

Start of motorway

End of motorway

Direction sign for motorway

Advance notice of a motorway exit

Advance direction sign on motorway

Exit countdown marker (300 metres)

Exit countdown marker (200 metres)

Exit countdown marker (100 metres)

Motorway exit direction sign

Start of urban area

End of urban area

Advance direction sign for specific lanes

Advance direction sign

Direction sign for highway

Direction sign

Direction sign for unpaved roads

Direction sign for through traffic

Priority over oncoming traffic

No through road

Hospital

First aid point

Public telephone

Vehicle repair station

Petrol station

Campsite

Restaurant

Refreshments

Hotel or motel

Public toilet

Information post

National speed limits

Detour scheme

Detour direction (turn right)

Detour direction (turn left)

Detour direction (proceed straight ahead)

Motorway direction (proceed straight ahead)

Motorway direction (turn right)

Announcement of lane change in 1000 metres

=== Additional signs ===
Priority road direction

Start

In front of and behind

End

Left

Left and right

Right

Distance to the object

Section length

Number of consecutive dangers

Time restriction

Risk of snow and/or ice

Risk of sudden fog

Dangerous road shoulder

Play street

Train operations

Vehicle type (truck)

Vehicle type (bicycle)

Vehicle type (motorcycle)

Vehicle type (car)

Vehicle type (bus)

Vehicle type (tram)

Disabled people

Except disabled people

Applicable in wet conditions

Telephone number

Sports facility

=== 1988 additions ===
Segregated pedestrian and cycle path

Segregated pedestrian and cycle path

Shared-use path

Highway exit direction sign

Park and ride

== See also ==
- Road signs in Germany
