= Road signs in Germany =

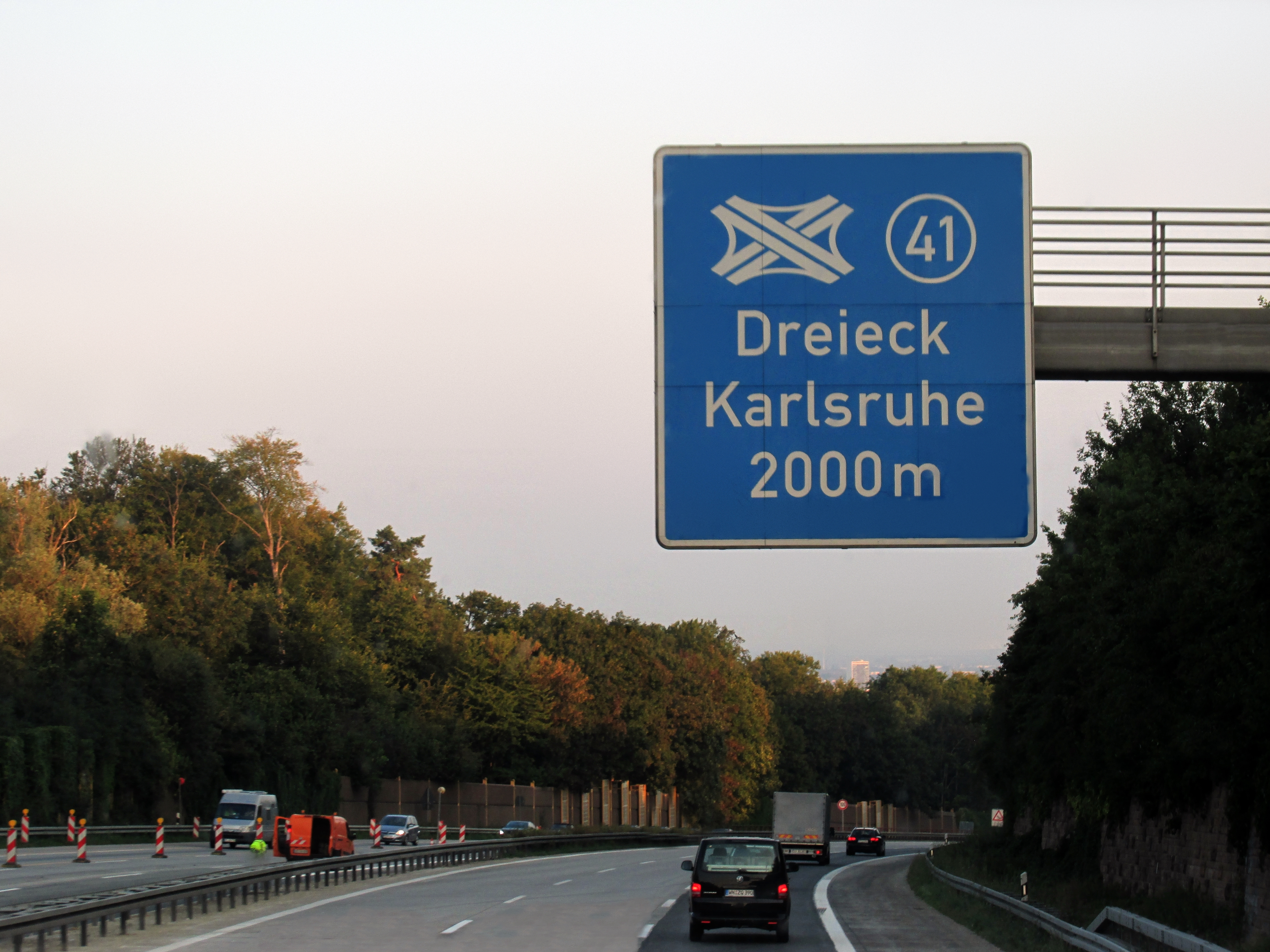
Gantry road sign indicating the exit no. 41 on an Autobahn

Road signs in Germany follow the design of that set out in the Vienna Convention on Road Signs and Signals.

Traffic signs, road markings, installations, and symbols used in Germany are prescribed by the Road Traffic Regulation (StVO, German: Straßenverkehrs-Ordnung) and the Traffic Signs Catalog (VzKat, German: Verkehrszeichenkatalog).

== Regulation ==
§§ 39 to 43 of the StVO regulate the effect of traffic signs and installations. Annexes 1 to 3 illustrate most warning, regulatory, and directional signs and annex 4 illustrates the traffic installations. Other traffic signs and installations not specified in the StVO, primarily specific supplementary signs, are published in the VzKat.

The latest version of the VzKat was issued in May 2017 as the annex to the General Administrative Rules for the Road Traffic Regulation (VwV-StVO, German: Allgemeine Verwaltungsvorschrift zur Straßenverkehrs-Ordnung).

The StVO, the VwV-StVO and the VzKat are supported by technical rules, mostly published by the Road and Transportation Research Association (FGSV), especially:

- The Guidelines for Directional Signage outside of Motorways (RWB, German: Richtlinien für die wegweisende Beschilderung außerhalb von Autobahnen)
- The Guidelines for Directional Signage on Motorways (RWBA, German: Richtlinien für die wegweisende Beschilderung auf Autobahnen)
- The Guidelines for Touristic Signage (RtB, German: Richtlinien für die touristische Beschilderung)
- The Guidelines for Signage for Detours (RUB, German: Richtlinien für Umleitungsbeschilderungen)
- The Guidelines for the Marking of Roads (RMS, German: Richtlinien für die Markierung von Straßen)
- The Guidelines for Traffic Signals (RiLSA, German: Richtlinien für Lichtsignalanlagen)
- The Guidelines for the Safety of Road Construction Sites (RSA, German: Richtlinien für die verkehrsrechtliche Sicherung von Arbeitsstellen an Straßen)

Each sign has an assigned number. The suffix number after the hyphen refers to the variation of the sign; the suffix on signs with variable numbers is the number depicted on the sign (for speed limits, maximum heights, etc.).

The used typeface is the DIN 1451 font.

== History ==
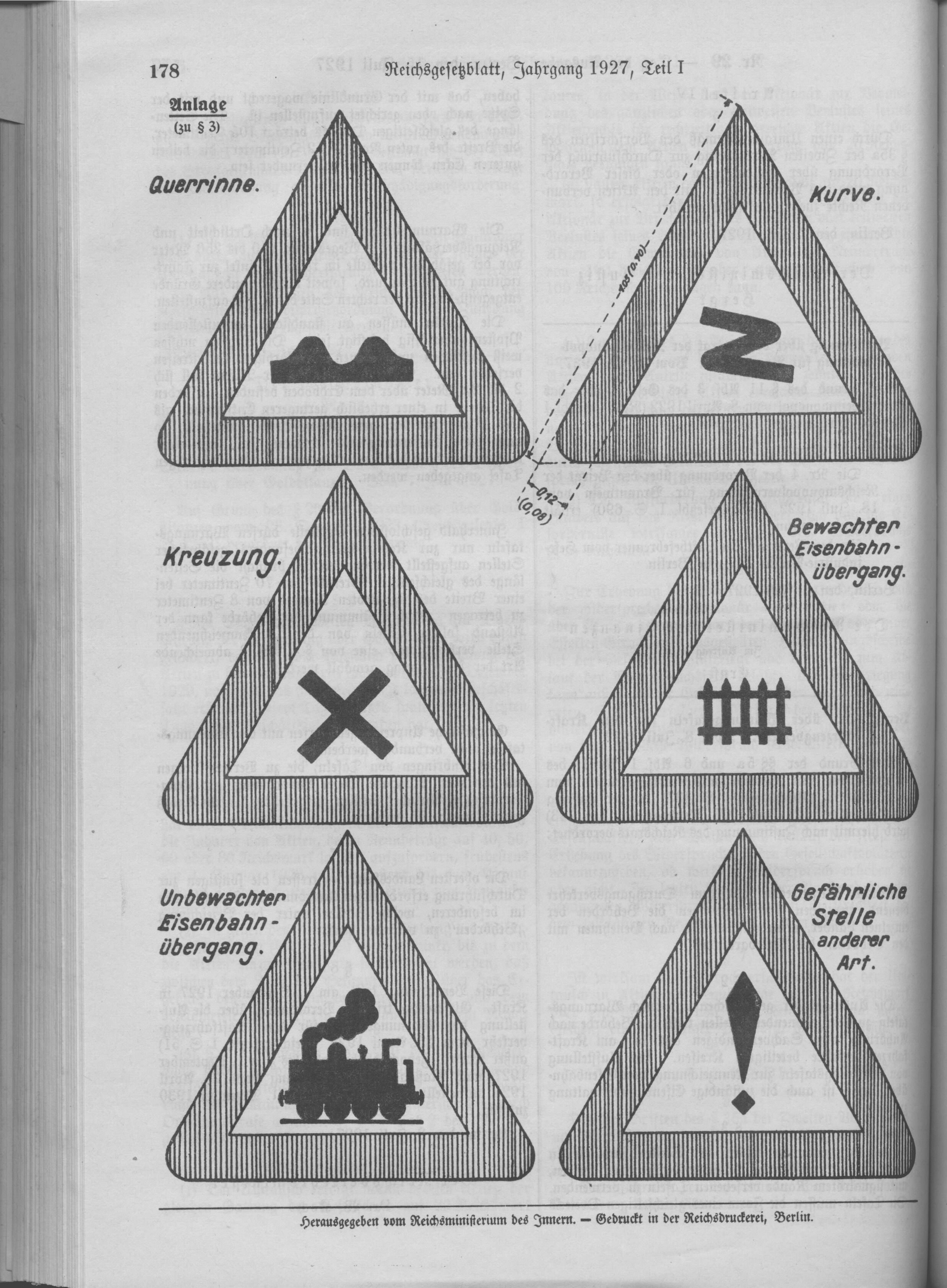
The first six warning signs in Germany which were introduced in 1927

The first set of unified road signs in Germany was introduced in 1927 in the Weimar Republic with the Verordnung über Warnungstafeln für den Kraftfahrzeugverkehr. It consisted of only 6 warning signs.

In 1934, this regulation was replaced with the Reich Road Traffic Regulation (German: Reichs-Straßenverkehrs-Ordnung cc), which was accompanied by an administrative ordinance (German: Ausführungsanweisung zur Reichs-Straßenverkehrs-Ordnung) with a set of 37 road signs.

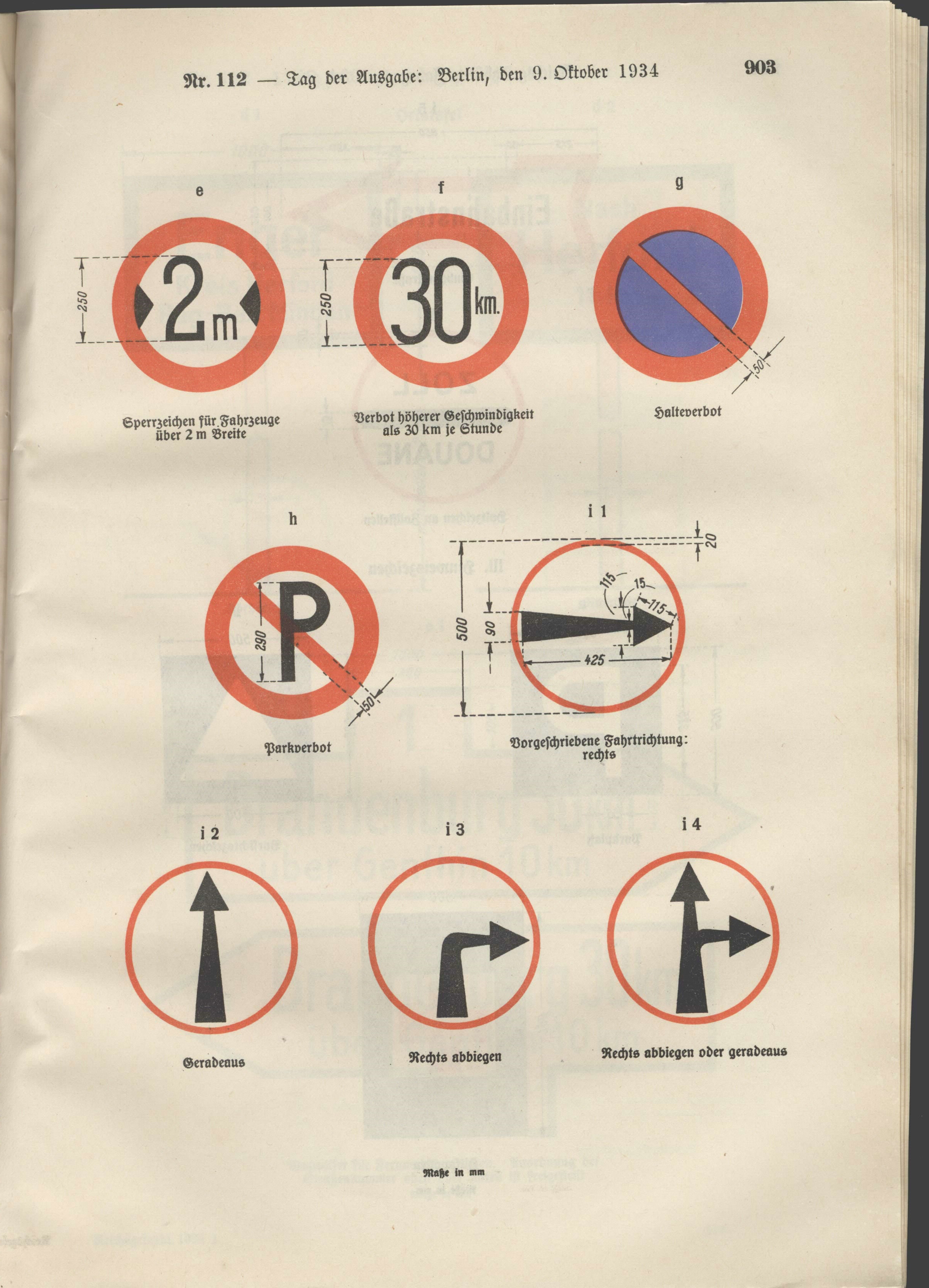
Some of the road signs of 1934 in the Reichsgesetzblatt. The mandatory signs are black arrows with white background and red border.

The Reich Road Traffic Regulation was replaced in 1938 with a regulation called "Regulation about the behavior in Road Traffic" (German: Verordnung über das Verhalten im Straßenverkehr), abbreviated "Road Traffic Regulation" (German: Straßenverkehrs-Ordnung). This regulation was amended a few times until the occupation of Germany in 1945.

The StVO of 1938 remained in force until 1971 in West Germany (with major amendmendts in 1953 and 1956) and until 1956 in East Germany.

Germany signed the Vienna Convention on Road Signs and Signal in 1968, together with the Vienna Convention on Road Traffic. The adoption of the provisions of both conventions led to the development of a new StVO which entered into force in 1971 in West Germany.

The first sign with symbols of the current design is Sign 325 (residential street), which has been introduced in 1980. In 1992 this design has been applied to all road signs of the StVO.

== General symbols ==
Motor vehicles (excluding motorcycles) (Note: More specifically, multi-track motor vehicles.)

Trucks (Note: More specifically, motor vehicles with a permissible mass above 3.5 t – including their trailer(s) – and tractor units, excluding passenger vehicles and buses.)

Cycle traffic

Cargo bike

Pedestrians

Equestrians

Cattle

Tram

Bus

Passenger vehicle

High-occupancy vehicle (Note: More specifically, passenger vehicles – or motorcycles with a sidecar – which are occupied by at least three people.)

Passenger vehicle with a trailer

Truck with a trailer

Campervan

Motor vehicles and vehicle combinations which cannot or may not drive faster than 25 km/h (16 mph)

Motorcycles – also with a sidecar – scooters, and motorized bicycles

Motorized bicycles

Electric bicycle (Note: One-seated two-wheeled mopeds with an electric motor which automatically regulates its design speed to no more than 25 km/h.)

Small electric vehicles (Note: Pursuant to the Elektrokleinstfahrzeuge-Verordnung (eKFV) (Small Electric Vehicle Act).)

Drawn carriage

Electrically powered vehicle (Note: Pursuant to the Fahrzeug-Zulassungsverordnung (FZV) (Vehicle Registration Regulation).)

Carsharing vehicles

== Danger signs ==
Sign 101
Danger. A supplementary sign can specify the danger.

Sign 101-10 / 101-20
Aircraft

Sign 101-11
Pedestrian crossing

Sign 101-21
Pedestrian crossing

Sign 101-12 / 101-22
Cattle

Sign 101-13 / 101-23
Equestrians

Sign 101-14 / 101-24
Amphibians

Sign 101-15
Rockfall

Sign 101-25
Rockfall

Sign 101-51
Slipperiness due to snow or ice

Sign 101-52
Grit/gravel at the edge of the road

Sign 101-53
Shore or riverbank

Sign 101-54
Insufficient clearance

Sign 101-55
Movable bridge

Sign 102
Intersection with priority to the right

Sign 103-10
Curve (left)

Sign 103-20
Curve (right)

Sign 105-10
Double curve (first left)

Sign 105-20
Double curve (first right)

Sign 108-10
Descent

Sign 110-12
Ascent

Sign 112
Uneven road

Sign 114
Slipperiness when road is wet or dirty

Sign 117-10
Crosswind

Sign 117-20
Crosswind

Sign 120
Road narrowing

Sign 121-10
One-sided road narrowing (right)

Sign 121-20
One-sided road narrowing (left)

Sign 123
Roadworks

Sign 124
Traffic jams

Sign 125
Oncoming traffic

Sign 131
Traffic signals

Sign 133-10 / 133-20
Pedestrians

Sign 136-10 / 136-20
Children

Sign 138-10 / 138-20
Cycles

Sign 142-10
Wild animals

Sign 142-20
Wild animals

Sign 151
Railroad crossing

Sign 156-10 / 156-20
Railroad crossing with three-striped warning – 240 m distance

Sign 156-11 / 156-21
Railroad crossing with three-striped warning – custom distance

Sign 157-10 / 157-20
Three-striped warning for railroad crossing – 240 m distance

Sign 157-11 / 157-21
Three-striped warning for railroad crossing – custom distance

Sign 159-10 / 159-20
Two-striped warning for railroad crossing – 160 m distance

Sign 159-11 / 159-21
Two-striped warning for railroad crossing – custom distance

Sign 162-10 / 162-20
One-striped warning for railroad crossing – 80 m distance

Sign 162-11 / 162-21
One-striped warning for railroad crossing – custom distance

== Regulatory signs ==
Sign 201-50 / 201-52
Crossbuck

Sign 201-51 / 201-53
Crossbuck indicating tracks possess overhead electrical wires

Sign 205
Yield

Sign 206
Stop

Sign 208
Oncoming traffic has priority

Sign 209
Turn right ahead

Sign 209-10
Turn left ahead

Sign 209-30
Go straight ahead

Sign 211
Turn right

Sign 211-10
Turn left

Sign 214
Go straight or turn right ahead

Sign 214-10
Go straight or turn left ahead

Sign 214-30
Turn left or right ahead

Sign 215
Roundabout

Sign 220-10
One-way street

Sign 220-20
One-way street

Sign 222
Pass on the right

Sign 222-10
Pass on the left

Sign 223.1-50 – 223.1-52
Rush-hour lane open (Note: Traffic permitted to use the hard shoulder.)

Sign 223.2-50 – 223.2-52
Rush-hour lane closed

Sign 223.3-50 – 223.3-52
Vacate rush-hour lane

Sign 224
Bus stop or tram stop (Note: 15 m parking prohibition prior to and behind this sign (30 m altogether))

Sign 224-51
Bus stop for school buses during designated times

Sign 229 – 229-31
Taxi stand

Sign 237
Bicycle path

Sign 238
Equestrian path

Sign 239
Sidewalk

Sign 240
Combined pedestrian and bicycle path

Sign 241-30
Separated pedestrian and bicycle path

Sign 241-31
Separated pedestrian and bicycle path

Sign 242.1
Start of pedestrian zone

Sign 242.2
End of pedestrian zone

Sign 244.1
Start of bicycle street

Sign 244.2
End of bicycle street

Sign 244.3
Start of bicycle zone

Sign 244.4
End of a bicycle zone

Sign 245
Bus lane

Sign 250
No vehicles of any kind permitted

Sign 251
No 2-tracked motor vehicles permitted

Sign 253
No vehicles over 3.5 t permitted

Sign 254
Cycles prohibited

Sign 255
Motorcycles, including those with sidecars, and mopeds forbidden

Sign 257-50
Mopeds prohibited

Sign 257-51
Horse-riders prohibited

Sign 257-52
Horse-drawn vehicles prohibited

Sign 257-53
Cattle traffic prohibited

Sign 257-54
Buses prohibited

Sign 257-55
Powered passenger cars prohibited

Sign 257-56
Powered passenger cars with trailers prohibited

Sign 257-57
Trucks with trailer(s) prohibited

Sign 257-58
Farm vehicles (25 km/h (16 mph) or slower) prohibited

Sign 259
Pedestrians prohibited

Sign 260
Motor vehicles prohibited

Sign 261
Trucks carrying hazardous materials prohibited

Sign 263–5,5
Total vehicle weight limit (5.5 tonnes)

Sign 263-8
Load limit per axle (8 tonnes)

Sign 264-2
Width limit (including wing mirrors)

Sign 265–3,8
Height limit (3.8 meters)

Sign 266-10
Length limit (10 meters)

Sign 267
No entry

Sign 268
Snow chains required

Sign 269
Trucks carrying water-polluting substances prohibited

Sign 270.1
Low-emission zone

Sign 270.2
End of low-emission zone

Sign 272
No U-turn

Sign 273
Minimum distance between vehicles over 3.5 t

Sign 274-60
Speed limit

Sign 274.1
Speed limit zone

Sign 274.2
End of speed limit zone

Sign 275-30
Minimum speed

Sign 276
No overtaking

Sign 277
No overtaking by vehicles over 3.5 t

Sign 277.1
No overtaking of cycles and mopeds

Sign 278-60
End of speed limit

Sign 279-30
End of minimum speed

Sign 280
End of no overtaking

Sign 281
End of no overtaking by vehicles over 3.5 t

Sign 281.1
End of no overtaking of cycles and mopeds

Sign 282
End of all restrictions

Sign 283
No stopping

Sign 283-10

Sign 283-11

Sign 283-20

Sign 283-21

Sign 283-30
Top arrow only (start of zone), bottom arrow only (end of zone)

Sign 283-31

Sign 286
No parking

Sign 286-10
Start of no parking zone (left side)

Sign 286-11

Sign 286-20
End of no parking zone (right side)

Sign 286-21
Start of no parking zone (right side)

Sign 286-30

Sign 286-31

Sign 290.1
No parking zone

Sign 290.2
End of no parking zone

Sign 293
Pedestrian crossing

Sign 294
Stop line

Sign 295
Solid line and edge line markings

Sign 296
Solid and broken line markings

Sign 297
Direction arrows

Sign 297.1
Advance notice arrow

Sign 297.1-21
Advance notice arrow to indicate a lane end

Sign 298
Hatched markings – occupying this area not permitted

Sign 299
No parking or waiting area

== Directional signs ==
Sign 301
Intersection ahead – right-of-way only for this intersection

Sign 306
Priority road – right-of-way on all following intersections

Sign 307
End of priority road

Sign 308
Priority over oncoming traffic

Sign 310
Start of urban area (implied 50 km/h (31 mph) speed limit)

Sign 311
End of urban area (with distance to next town)

Sign 314
Parking place

Sign 314-10
Parking place (start)

Sign 314-20
Parking place (end)

Sign 314-30

Sign 314-50
Parking garage

Sign 314.1
Start of parking management area (Note: Only parking with parking disc or parking ticket)

Sign 314.2
End of parking management area

Sign 315-50
Sidewalk parking (Note: For vehicles with a gross vehicle weight up to 2.8 metric tons.)

Sign 315-55

Sign 315-60

Sign 315-65

Sign 315-70

Sign 315-75

Sign 315-80

Sign 315-85

Sign 316
Park and ride

Sign 316-50
Park and carpool

Sign 317
Parking for hikers

Sign 318
Parking disc

Sign 325.1
Traffic calming zone

Sign 325.2
End of traffic calming zone

Sign 327
Tunnel

Sign 327-50
Length of tunnel

Sign 328
Breakdown bay (Note: Used only on highways without emergency shoulder or in larger construction areas.)

Sign 330.1
Start of Autobahn

Sign 330.2
End of Autobahn

Sign 331.1
Start of expressway

Sign 331.2
End of expressway

Sign 332
Exit direction sign (Autobahn)

Sign 332.1
Exit direction sign (Bundesstraße)

Sign 332.1-20
Exit direction sign (other roads)

Sign 333
Autobahn exit

Sign 333.1
Bundesstraße exit

Sign 333.1-20
Exit (other roads)

Sign 340
Guide (broken) line marking

Sign 341
Yield line markings

Sign 342
"Shark teeth" markings

Sign 350-10
Pedestrian crossing

Sign 350-20
Pedestrian crossing

Sign 350.1
Bicycle highway

Sign 350.2
End of bicycle highway

Sign 354
Water protection area

Sign 356
Pedestrian crossing patrol

Sign 357
Dead end

Sign 357-50
Dead end (except for pedestrians and cycles)

Sign 357-51
Dead end (except for pedestrians)

Sign 357-52
Dead end (except for cyclists)

Sign 358
First aid or hospital

Sign 363
Police station

Sign 365-50
Telephone

Sign 365-51
Emergency telephone

Sign 365-52
Petrol station

Sign 365-53
Petrol station with LPG

Sign 365-54
Petrol station with CNG

Sign 365-55
Motorway hotel

Sign 376
Motorway restaurant

Sign 377
Motorway refreshments

Sign 378
Public toilet

Sign 365-59
Road church

Sign 365-60
Camping and caravan site

Sign 365-61
Information

Sign 365-62
Repairs

Sign 365-63
Pedestrian underpass

Sign 365-64
Pedestrian overpass

Sign 365-65
Charging station for electric vehicles

Sign 365-66
Hydrogen Station

Sign 365-67
Motor caravan campsite

Sign 365-68
Campersite

Sign 385
Place name (Note: Information only, does not imply a speed limit)
old number since 2017: 385-50

Sign 386.1
Tourist attraction

Sign 386.1-10

Sign 386.1-11
new design 2017

Sign 386.1-12

Sign 386.1-20
new sign 2017

Sign 386.1-21
new design 2017

Sign 386.1-22

Sign 386.1-30

Sign 386.1-50
old number since 2017: 386.1-32

Sign 386.1-51
old number since 2017: 386.1-33

Sign 386.1-52
old number since 2017: 386.1-34

Sign 386.1-53
old number since 2017: 386.1-50

Sign 386.2
Tourist route

Sign 386.2-10
new design 2017

Sign 386.2-11
new sign 2017

Sign 386.2-12
new sign 2017

Sign 386.2-22
new sign 2017

Sign 386.2-20
new design 2017

Sign 386.2-21
new sign 2017

Sign 386.2-30
new sign 2017

Sign 386.2-51
new sign 2017

Sign 386.2-52
old number since 2017: 386.2-30

Sign 386.2-53
new sign 2017

Sign 386.3

Sign 386.3-50

Sign 390
Toll road for heavy lorries

Sign 390.2
End of toll road for heavy lorries

Sign 391
Toll road

Sign 392
Stop – customs

Sign 393
Speed limits in Germany

Sign 394-50
Street light warning marker (lamp will not remain lit all night)

Sign 401
Bundesstraße route number

Sign 405
Autobahn route number

Sign 406-50
Exit number

Sign 406-51

Sign 410
European route number

Sign 415-10
Signpost at junction leading onto a minor road

Sign 415-20

Sign 415-10

Sign 415-20

Sign 418-10

Sign 418-20

Sign 419-10
Signpost at junction

Sign 419-20

Sign 421-20
Route for vehicles over 3.5 t

Sign 422-10

Sign 422-11

Sign 422-20

Sign 422-21

Sign 422-30

Sign 422-32

Sign 422-34

Sign 422-36

Sign 430-10
Direction towards Autobahn entrance

Sign 430-20

Sign 432-10
Direction to train station

Sign 432-20

Sign 434
Sign on approaches to junctions

Sign 434-52

Sign 434-53

Sign 437
Street name sign

Sign 438
Sign on approaches to junctions

Sign 439
Sign on approaches to junctions (lanes)

Sign 440
Autobahn junction entrance sign

Sign 441
Autobahn junction entrance sign

Sign 442-10
old number since 2017: 442-11

Sign 442-12
old number since 2017: 442-13

Sign 442-13
old number since 2017: 442-10

Sign 442-20
old number since 2017: 442-21

Sign 442-22
old number since 2017: 442-23

Sign 442-23
old number since 2017: 442-20

Sign 442-50
new sign 2017

Sign 442-51
new sign 2017

Sign 442-52
new sign 2017

Sign 442-53
new sign 2017

Sign 448
Next exit sign (Autobahn)

Sign 448-50
Next exit sign (other roads)

Sign 448.1
Autobahn sign indicating next exit has a service area nearby

Sign 449
Autobahn reminder exit sign, showing next exit ahead

Sign 450-50
Exit countdown marker (Autobahn, 100 m before exit)

Sign 450-51
Exit countdown marker (Autobahn, 200 m before exit)

Sign 450-52
Exit countdown marker (Autobahn, 300 m before exit)

Sign 450-53
Exit countdown marker (other roads, 100 m before exit)

Sign 450-54
Exit countdown marker (other roads, 200 m before exit)

Sign 450-55
Exit countdown marker (other roads, 300 m before exit)

Sign 453
Route confirmation sign (Autobahn)

Sign 453-50
Route confirmation sign (other roads)

Sign 454-10
Detour or bypass signpost

Sign 454-20

Sign 455.1-10

Sign 455.1-11

Sign 455.1-12

Sign 455.1-20

Sign 455.1-21

Sign 455.1-22

Sign 455.1-30
Detour or bypass

Sign 455.1-50

Sign 455.2

Sign 457.1
Detour or bypass sign

Sign 457.2
End of detour or bypass

Sign 458
Detour or bypass route layout

Sign 460-10

Sign 460-11

Sign 460-12

Sign 460-20

Sign 460-21

Sign 460-22

Sign 460-30
Detour (Autobahn)

Sign 460-50
new sign 2017

Sign 466
Autobahn detour ahead

Sign 467.1-10
Existing alternate route or bypass (Autobahn)

Sign 467.1-20

Sign 467.1-30

Sign 467.2
End of detour or bypass (symbol)

Sign 500
Detouring onto opposite lane (in 200 m)

Sign 501-10

Sign 501-11

Sign 501-12

Sign 501-15
new sign 2017

Sign 501-16
old number since 2017: 501-15

Sign 501-17
old number since 2017: 501-16

Sign 501-18
old number since 2017: 501-17

Sign 501-20

Sign 501-21

Sign 501-22

Sign 505-11
old number since 2017: 505-12

Sign 505-12
new sign 2017

Sign 505-21
old number since 2017: 505-22

Sign 505-22
new sign 2017

Sign 511-11

Sign 511-12

Sign 511-20

Sign 511-21

Sign 511-22

Sign 513-10

Sign 513-11

Sign 513-20

Sign 513-21

Sign 514-10

Sign 514-20

Sign 515-11
old number since 2017: 515-12

Sign 515-12
old number since 2017: 515-13

Sign 515-21
old number since 2017: 515-22

Sign 515-22
old number since 2017: 515-23

Sign 521-30

Sign 521-31

Sign 521-32

Sign 521-33

Sign 522-30

Sign 522-31

Sign 522-32

Sign 522-33

Sign 522-34

Sign 522-35

Sign 522-36

Sign 522-37
new sign 2017

Sign 522-38
new sign 2017

Sign 531-10
End of lane

Sign 532-10

Sign 535-11

Sign 536-20

Sign 541-10

Sign 542-10

Sign 545-11

Sign 546-10

Sign 551-20

Sign 551-21

Sign 551-22

Sign 590-10
Complicated traffic touring (if turning left is forbidden)

Sign 590-11

== Road equipment ==
Sign 600-30
Barrier board

Sign 605-10
Guiding beacon

Sign 605-11

Sign 605-13

Sign 605-14

Sign 605-23

Sign 605-24

Sign 610-40
Guide cone

Sign 615
Moveable road barrier

Sign 616-30
Moveable road barrier with flashing arrow

Sign 616-31

Sign 620-40
Reflection post (right-hand side)

Sign 620-41
Reflection post (left-hand side)

Sign 625-10

Sign 626-10

Sign 626-20

Sign 626-30

Sign 626-31

Sign 627-50

Sign 628-10

Sign 629-10

Sign 630-10

== Additional signs ==
To the left

To the right

After the left turn, a hazard exists (another sign defining the hazard would be above)

After the right turn, a hazard exists (another sign defining the hazard would be above)

Fußgänger Gehweg gegenüber benutzen
Use Sidewalk on left side of roadway

Fußgänger Gehweg gegenüber benutzen
Use Sidewalk on right side of roadway

Directional indications by arrows, detour signs, three-quarter circle

Both directions, two opposing horizontal arrows

Both directions, two opposite vertical arrows

Two-way cycle route crossing road

Cycling in the opposite direction

Directional indications by arrows, detour signs, semicircle

For 800 m

For 3 km

Continues for ... m

Continues for ... km

Course of this priority road turns left

Road from left and ahead has priority

100 m ahead

200 m ahead

400 m ahead

600 m ahead

2 km ahead

Stop 100 m ahead

Zipper method in ... m

Late merge in 200 m

Ends in ...m

Hazardous Sidewinds for cars with caravans/trailers

Risk of accident

Migratory toad crossing

Oil slick

Smoke

Loose chippings

Construction site exit

Damaged roadway

Spillage on road

Exit

Accident

Knoll

Police check

Fog

Driveway

Right of way changed

Traffic routing changed

Industrial area (trains have priority)

Port area (rail traffic has priority)

Children allowed to play in road

Skiers allowed to cross road

Large wagons can park here without the usual two week temporal parking restriction

Caravans can park here without the usual two week temporal parking restriction

Information about motorail for lorries

End of restriction

Cyclists dismount

Green wave at ...km/h

Stop here on red

Pass over verges/shoulder

End of passing over verges/shoulder

Tunnel category B

Tunnel category C

Tunnel category D

Tunnel category E

Disabled with permit No. ... allowed

Bicycle and residents allowed

Residents only

Residents or Resident's Visitors Parking Only

Residents with permit No. ... allowed

Taxis allowed

Regular scheduled buses allowed

Emergency vehicles allowed

Ambulances allowed

Delivery vehicles allowed

Agricultural vehicles allowed

Forestry vehicles allowed

Agricultural and forestry vehicles allowed

Operational and utility vehicles allowed

Electric vehicles while charging allowed

Electric vehicles allowed

Construction vehicles allowed

Access to construction site allowed

Access to neighbouring construction site allowed

Access to ... allowed

Ferry users allowed

Vehicles with red, yellow or green Low Emission Zone Sticker permitted

Vehicles with yellow or green Low Emission Zone Sticker permitted

Vehicles with green Low Emission Zone Sticker permitted

Skiers crossing road at times shown

At times shown

At times shown

Parking with disc for 2 hours

Parking with disc in marked zone for 2 hours

Working days

Working days at times shown

Working days at times shown

Monday-Friday, at times shown

Tuesdays, Thursdays and Fridays, at times shown

Sundays and public holidays, at times shown

School bus (at times shown)

Parking allowed at weekends

Disabled users only

Disabled with permit No. ... only

Residents with permit No. ... only

Slow vehicles are allowed to be passed

Taxi stand

Number of taxis

Electric vehicles while being charged (with number)

Electric vehicles (with number)

Parking allowed in marked areas

Only with parking ticket

Toll ticket

On the verges/shoulder

When wet

Through traffic

Weight (12 tons)

Park (pull in straight)

Park (pull in diagonally)

Only within marked parking areas

For cyclists and moped riders

Grit on road

No parking on verges/shoulder

Also buses and cars with trailers

Rabies! Endangered area

Wild animal rabies! Endangered area
Bicycles permitted

Electric Bicycles permitted

Mopeds

Mopeds permitted

No Mopeds permitted

Motorcycles (above 500 cc), also with sidecar, small motorcycles (below 500 cc) and mopeds

Motorcycles and Mopeds Permitted

Cars

Cars permitted

Electric vehicles/cars

Cars with trailer

Cars with trailer permitted

Motorhomes & Campers

Farm & Powered Equipment (& Trailers) with less than 25 km/h (16 mph) top speed

Farm & Powered Equipment (& Trailers) Permitted

Horse-drawn Wagon

Trucks

Trucks permitted

Truck with trailer

Truck with trailer permitted

Semi/tractor-trailer

Single- and double-trailer semis

Dangerous or Hazardous Load/Cargos

Dangerous or Hazardous Loads/Cargos to Water Bodies

Bus

Buses permitted

Streetrail or trams

Trams permitted

Train

Trains permitted

Military vehicles (generally a weight rating)

Trucks, busses and cars with trailers

== Obsolete signs ==
=== Obsolete signs since 2013 ===
Level crossing with barrier or gate ahead

Level crossing with barrier or gate ahead

One-way traffic

Recommended speed

End of recommended speed

Soft verges

Soft verges

=== Obsolete signs since 2017 ===
Sign 145-10

Sign 1000-33

Sign 1006-38

Sign 1006-39

Sign 1007-30

Sign 1012-30

Sign 1026-31

Sign 1030-10

Sign 1060-11

Sign 1060-30

== Historic signs ==
=== 1934 road signs ===
==== Warning signs ====
Uneven road

Series of bends

Crossroad

Railway crossing with gates

Railway crossing without gates

Danger

Give way

==== Regulatory signs ====
No vehicles

No entry

No motor vehicles

No motorcycles

No motor vehicles (in weekends and holidays)

No motorcycles (in weekends and holidays)

Bicycle path

Weight limit

Width limit

Speed limit

No stopping

No parking

Turn right

Straight ahead

Turn right ahead

Straight ahead or turn right

One-way traffic

Customs

==== Information signs ====
Parking

Caution

First aid

Urban area

Urban area ends

Direction sign for highways

Direction sign

Highway number

Ringroad or beltway for long-distance traffic

Advance direction sign (new sign in 1936)

Priority road

Second-order road

=== 1938 road signs ===
==== Warning signs ====
Danger

Uneven road

Series of bends

Crossroad

Railway crossing with gates

Railway crossing without gates

Countdown beacon

Countdown beacon

Countdown beacon

Countdown beacon

==== Regulatory signs ====
No vehicles

No entry

No motor vehicles

No motorcycles

No motor vehicles (in weekends and holidays)

No motorcycles (in weekends and holidays)

Bicycle path

Weight limit

Width limit

Height limit

Speed limit

No stopping

No parking

Turn right

Straight ahead

Turn right ahead

Straight ahead or turn right

One-way traffic

Customs

Give way

Stop

Taxi stand

==== Information signs ====
Parking

Caution

First aid

Street Lighting not in use for the whole night

Over-voltage Street Lighting not in use for the whole night

Urban area begins

Urban area ends

Direction sign for highways

Direction sign

Direction sign for unpaved roads

Highway number

Ringroad or beltway for long-distance traffic (removed in 1945)

Advance direction sign

Priority road

Detour

Detour scheme

=== 1953 road signs ===
==== Warning signs ====
Danger

Roadworks
(alternative option)

Uneven road

Slippery road

Series of bends

Crossroad

Pedestrian crossing

Single crossbuck

Single crossbuck

Single crossbuck

Double crossbuck

Double crossbuck

Level crossing with barriers

Level crossing without barriers

Countdown beacon (240 m)

Countdown beacon (240 m)

Countdown beacon (160 m)

Countdown beacon (80 m)

==== Regulatory signs ====
No vehicles

No entry

No motor vehicles

No motorcycles

No bicycles

No motor vehicles (on holidays and weekends)

No motorcycles (on holidays and weekends)

No bicycles (on holidays and weekends)

Bicycle path

Horse riding path

Footpath

Weight limit

Width limit

Height limit

Speed limit

No overtaking

No stopping

No parking

Turn right

Straight ahead

Turn right ahead

Straight ahead or turn right

One-way traffic

Customs

Give way

Stop

Taxi stand

==== Information signs ====
Parking

Caution

First aid

Street lighting not in use for the whole night

Over-voltage street lighting not in use for the whole night

Urban area begins

Urban area ends

Direction sign for highways

Direction sign

Direction sign for unpaved roads

Highway number

Advance direction sign

Priority road

Detour

Detour scheme

=== 1956 road signs ===
==== Warning signs ====
Danger

Uneven road

Slippery road

Steep descent

Road narrow

Opening bridge

Roadwork

Children

Deer

Cattle

Series of bends

Crossroad

Pedestrian crossing

Single crossbuck

Single crossbuck

Single crossbuck

Double crossbuck

Double crossbuck

Level crossing with barriers

Level crossing without barriers

Countdown beacon (240 m)

Countdown beacon (240 m)

Countdown beacon (160 m)

Countdown beacon (80 m)

==== Regulatory signs ====
No vehicles

No entry

No motor vehicles

No trucks

No motorcycles

No bicycles

No motor vehicles (on holidays and weekends)

No trucks (on holidays and weekends)

No motorcycles (on holidays and weekends)

No bicycles (on holidays and weekends)

Bicycle path

Horse riding path

Footpath

Motor vehicles only

Weight limit

Axle weight limit

Width limit

Height limit

Speed limit

Speed limit ends

No overtaking

No stopping

No parking

Keep right

Keep left

Turn right

Turn right ahead

Straight ahead

Turn left

Turn left ahead

Turn right and left

Straight ahead and turn right

Straight ahead and turn left

Roundabout

One-way traffic

Customs

Give way

Stop

Taxi stand

==== Information signs ====
Parking

Caution

First aid

Repair service

Telephone

Fuel station

Street lighting not in use for the whole night

Over-voltage street lighting not in use for the whole night

Urban area begins

Urban area ends

Object name (river)

Direction sign for highways

Direction sign

Direction sign for unpaved roads

Highway number

Direction sign for motorway

Advance direction sign

Direction sign for trucks (go right)

Direction sign for trucks (go left)

Priority road

Detour scheme

Detour

=== 1971 road signs ===
==== Warning signs ====
101: Other danger

102: Intersection

103: Left curve

103: Right curve

105: Right double curve

105: Left double curve

108: Steep descent

110: Steep ascent

112: Uneven road

114: Slippery road

115: Falling rocks (from right side)

116: Falling rocks (from left side)

117: Crosswinds

118: Crosswinds

120: Road narrows (both sides)

121: Road narrows (right side)

122: Road narrows (left side)

123: Roadworks

125: Two-way traffic

128: Opening bridge

129: Riverbank

131: Traffic signals ahead

133: Pedestrians

134: Pedestrian crossing ahead

135: Pedestrian crossing ahead

136: Children

138: Bicycle crossing

140: Animals (domesticated)

142: Animals (wild)

144: Low-flying planes

150: Level crossing with gates

151: Level crossing without gates

153: Three-stripe beacon announcing level crossing with barriers (left)

156: Three-stripe beacon announcing level crossing without barriers (right)

159: Two-stripe beacon about 160 m before level crossing (left)

162: One-stripe beacon about 80 m before level crossing (right)

==== Regulatory signs ====
201: Railway Crossbuck

202: Railway Crossbuck

203: Railway Crossbuck with Overhead Wires

204: Railway Crossbuck with Overhead Wires

205: Yield

206: Stop

208: Yield to Oncoming traffic

209: Turn Right

210: Turn Left

211: Follow Right

212: Follow Left

213: Go straight

214: Straight Ahead or Turn Right

215: Straight Ahead or Turn Left

216: Turn Right and Left

219: One-way traffic pointing Right

220: One-way traffic pointing Left

222: Keep Right

223: Keep Left

224: Tram Stop

225: Double Tram Stop

226: Bus Stop

229: Taxi Stand

237: Bike Path

239: Bridleway

241: Pedestrian Path

242: Shared Path

243: Shared Path

244: Shared Path

244: Shared Path

245: Bus Lane

250: Closed to All Vehicles

251: No Cars

252: No Entry for Motorbike or Cars

253: No Trucks

253: No Trucks with a gross vehicle weight of more than 3.5 t and tractors

254: No Bike

255: No Motorbike

256: No Trailers

257: No Horse-drawn Vehicles

258: No Equestrians

259: No Pedestrians

260: No Mopeds

261: No Motor vehicles subject to Identification of Dangerous Goods

262: Weight limit

263: Axle Load Limit

264: Width Limit

265: Height Limit

266: Length Limit

267: No Entry

268: Snow Chains Mandatory

269: No vehicles transporting goods dangerous to water reserves

270: Worded Prohibition (SMOG)

273: No traffic allowed without indicated minimum distance between vehicles

274: Speed Limit (30 km)

274: Speed Limit (40 km)

274: Speed Limit (60 km)

275: Minimum Speed

276: No Overtaking

277: No Overtaking by Lorries

278: End of Speed Limit

279: End of Minimum Speed

280: End of Overtaking prohibition

281: End of Overtaking by Lorries prohibition

282: End of All Speed and Passing Limits

283: Clearway no Stopping

283 A: No Stopping (Start)

283 E: No Stopping (End)

283 M: No Stopping (Middle)

286: No Parking or waiting

286 A: No Parking (Start)

286 E: No Parking (End)

283 M: No Parking (Middle)

290: No Parking Zone

291: Parking Disc

292: End of No Parking Zone

293: Pedestrian crossing

294: Stopping line

295: Lane or road boundary

296: One-sided lane boundary

297: Direction arrows

298: Marking for barred area

299: marking for no stopping or no parking area

==== Information signs ====
301: Intersection with Priority

306: Beginning of Priority Road

307: End of Priority Road

308: Priority over Oncoming Traffic

308: Priority over Oncoming Traffic

310: Start of Urban area

311: End of Urban area

311: End of Urban area

314: Parking

314 a: Parking (left)

314 b: Parking (right)

314 c: Parking (distance indication)

315: Pavement Parking

316: Pavement Parking

317: Sidewalk Parking

318: Sidewalk Parking

321:

322:

323:

324:

362: Park and Ride

329: Parking for hikers

330: Beginning of Motorway

331: Beginning of Motorized

332: Motorway Exit

332a: Highway Exit

332b: Urban Road Exit

333: Motorway Exit

333a: Highway Exit

333b: Urban Road Exit

334: End of Motorway

335: End of Motorway (100 m)

336: End of Motorized

337: End of Dual Carriageway (200 m)

340: advisory lane boundary

341: waiting line

350: Crosswalk

351: Crosswalk

353: One-way traffic

354: Water Reserves Area

355: Pedestrian Underpass

356: Pedestrian Crossing Patrol

357: No Through Road

358: First Aid or Hospital

359: Repairs

360: Telephone

360d: Emergency Telephone

361: Petrol Station

363: Police Station

364: Camping Site

365: Caravan Site

366: Caravan and Camping Site

367: Information

375: Motorway Hotel

376: Motorway Restaurant

377: Motorway Refreshment

378: Toilet

380: Recommended speed

385: Sign for off-road villages

385: Sign for rivers

392: Stop - Customs

394: Street Lighting not in use for the whole night

401: Federal Highway Number

410: European road number sign

415: Signpost at Junction leading onto a Major Road

418: Signpost at Junction leading onto a Minor Road

419: Signpost at Junction

421: Route for Truck

421: Route for Bike

421: Route for Pedestrians

430: Signpost at Junction leading directly onto a Motorway

432: Signpost at Junction

436: Sign on approaches to Junctions

437: Street Name Sign

438: Sign on approaches to Junctions

439: Sign on approaches to Junctions (lanes)

440: Motorway Junction Sign

442: Junction for Cyclists (turn right ahead)

443: Junction for Cyclists (turn left ahead)

Junction for Bike (straight ahead)

Junction for Truck (turn left ahead)

Junction for Truck (turn right ahead)

Junction for Truck (straight ahead)

Diversion (turn right ahead)

Diversion (turn left ahead)

Diversion (straight ahead)

Diversion (turn left)

Diversion (turn right)

Diversion (keep left)

Diversion (keep right)

Diversion Ends

448: Motorway Interchange (1000 m)

449: Direction Sign on Motorway

450: Motorway marker (300 m before exit)

451: Motorway marker (200 m before exit)

452: Motorway marker (100 m before exit)

453: Motorway Distance Sign

== See also ==
- Transport in Germany
- Road signs in East Germany
- Road signs in Austria
