= Straßenverkehrs-Ordnung =

Straßenverkehrs-Ordnung (German for 'road traffic regulation', abbreviated StVO) is the traffic code in Germany. The date of issue is on 2013-03-06 and the latest revised version is on 2024-12-11.

== Special point ==
=== Priority ===
The sign which shows the priority road.

In Germany, there is a yellow square sign to show the priority road (German: Vorfahrtstraße).

(1) An Kreuzungen und Einmündungen hat die Vorfahrt, wer von rechts kommt. Das gilt nicht,

1. wenn die Vorfahrt durch Verkehrszeichen besonders geregelt ist (Zeichen 205, 206, 301, 306) oder 2.

für Fahrzeuge, die aus einem Feld- oder Waldweg auf eine andere Straße kommen.

— § 8 Vorfahrt, 8(1)

The detailed regulation is mentioned in article 8. It is translated:

(1) At intersections and junctions, the right of way belongs to whoever comes from the right. This does not apply:

1. if the right of way is specially regulated by traffic signs (signs 205, 206, 301, 306), or
2. for vehicles coming from a field or forest path onto another road.

== See also ==
- Road signs in Germany
