= Tern (typeface) =

Sans-serif typeface used on road signs in Austria and Slovakia

- Category: Sans-serif
- Foundry: International Institute for Information Design
- Date released: 2008
- Variations: TernVMS (Variable-message sign)
- Website: https://iiidre.weebly.com/#/

Tern is a sans-serif typeface, which is used on traffic signs in Austria and Slovakia.

The typeface has been officially adopted as road sign typeface in Austria in 2013, although it was already in use since 2010 and replaced the former Austria typeface.

The development of the typeface started in 2005 as part of the sixth Framework Program for Research and Technological Development. The typeface was developed together with a set of symbols, of which 65 were adopted in 2020 as new symbols for the road signs in Austria.

== See also ==
- List of public signage typefaces
