= Disabled parking permit =

Parking privilege for disabled people

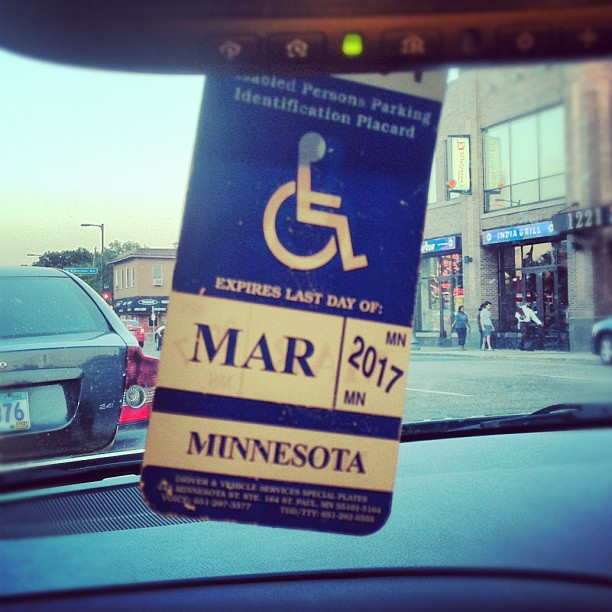
Disabled parking permit in a car in Minnesota

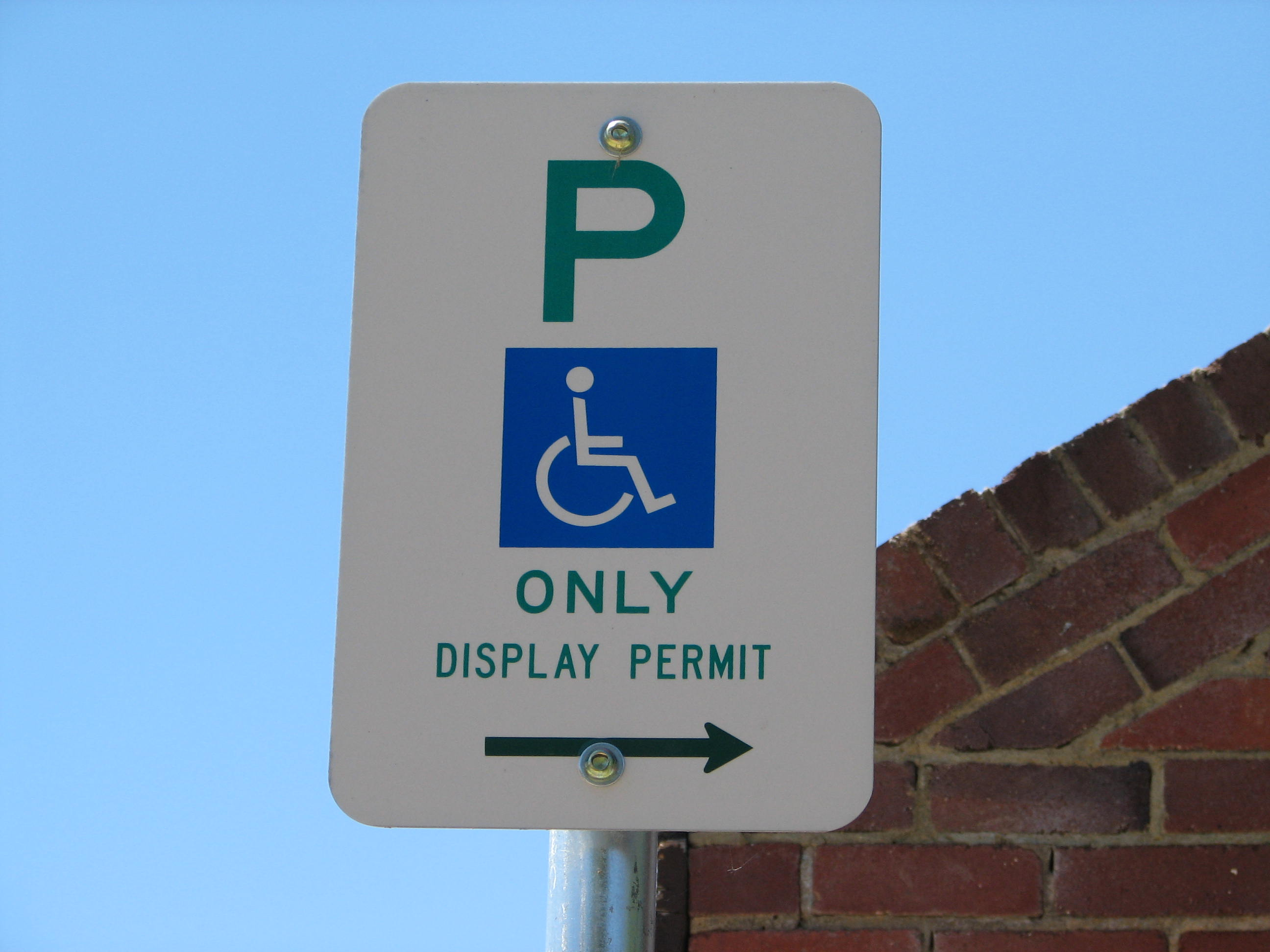
A sign requesting permits be displayed for a disabled parking place in Canberra, Australia.

A disabled parking permit, also known as a disabled badge, disabled placard, handicapped permit, handicapped placard, handicapped tag, and "Blue Badge" in the European Union, is a permit that is displayed upon parking a vehicle. It gives the operator of a vehicle permission to special privileges regarding the parking of that vehicle. These privileges include parking in a space reserved for persons with disabilities, or, in some situations, permission to park in a time-limited space for a longer time, or to park at a meter without payment.

Disabled parking permits and places are often abused, being used by non-disabled drivers.

== Reciprocal recognition ==
Member Countries of the International Transport Forum, an inter-governmental organisation within the OECD, would from 1978 grant the same parking concessions to people with disabilities as they offered their own nationals.

The resolution was updated and extended in 1997 by "Resolution no. 97/4 on Reciprocal Recognition of Parking Badges for Persons with Mobility Handicaps", and now applies to ITF member states as well as associated countries. The condition is the display of a badge showing the international wheelchair symbol.

The International Transport Forum was called the European Conference of Ministers of Transport (ECMT) between 1953 and 2007.

== North America ==
=== Canada ===
In Canada, disabled parking infrastructure operates under a decentralized framework where design and medical eligibility are regulated by provincial and territorial ministries, while local parking concessions are determined by municipal bylaws. Inter-provincial and international travel is covered by the Transport Canada Mutual Recognition of Parking Badges Agreement, which ensures universal recognition of valid permits across all Canadian provinces, the United States, and participating international territories.

Canada relies exclusively on portable placards displayed on the dashboard or sun visor rather than specialized license plates. Because the permit is legally tied to the individual rather than a vehicle, it can be transferred between any personal, commercial, or ride-share vehicle, provided the permit holder is travelling in it.

Medical eligibility requires certification from a regulated healthcare practitioner. While the baseline criteria target severe mobility impairments (often defined as the inability to walk a specific distance, such as 50 to 200 metres, without health risks or assistive devices), specific qualifications vary by region:

- British Columbia: Administered via the non-profit SPARC BC, focusing on physical mobility impairments or severe respiratory conditions requiring portable oxygen.
- Ontario: Managed by ServiceOntario under the Highway Traffic Act. Criteria include severe physical restrictions and legal blindness but explicitly exclude deafness or cognitive conditions unless they directly cause physical walking impediments.
- Quebec: Managed by the Société de l'assurance automobile du Québec (SAAQ), which uniquely incorporates specific evaluation criteria for intellectual, psychological, or psychiatric disabilities if they create severe safety risks during transit.

Placards are generally issued as permanent (typically valid for 3 to 5 years and renewable without recertification) or temporary (valid up to 6 months for short-term medical recovery). While the International Symbol of Access guarantees access to designated stalls nationwide, municipal bylaws dictate whether permit holders receive on-street concessions like free meter parking or extended time limits. To curb abuse, parking authorities can demand identification to verify the permit holder's presence; illegal use, alteration, or fraud carries strict fines ranging from $300 up to $5,000 depending on the jurisdiction.

=== United States ===
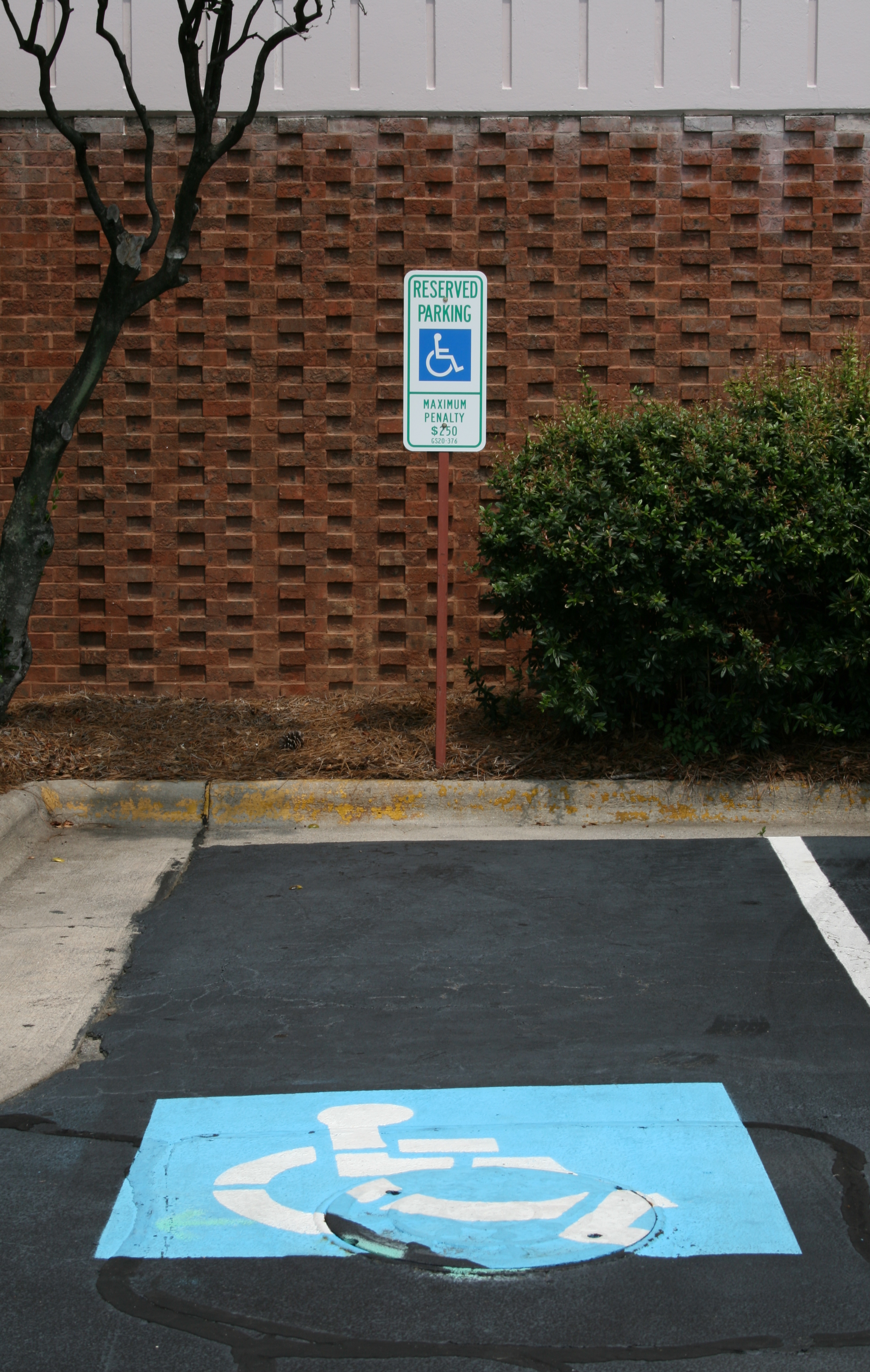
Accessible parking space at the University of North Carolina in Chapel Hill

In the United States, reserved spaces are mandated by the Americans with Disabilities Act Accessibility Guidelines. Disabled parking permits generally take the form of either specially marked license plates or a placard that hangs from the rear-view mirror. Plates are generally used for disabled drivers in their personal vehicle, while the portable disability placard can be moved from one vehicle to another with the disabled person, both when driving or when riding with another driver.

The medical requirements to obtain a permit vary by state, but are usually confined to specific types of disabilities. These, as a general rule, include the use of any assistive device such as a wheelchair, crutches, or a cane, as well as a missing leg or foot. Some states also include certain cardiovascular, pain, or respiratory conditions. About half of the US states (26) include blindness as a qualifying disability, enabling the person to obtain a disability parking permit for use as a passenger, and 14 states include a disabled hand as a qualifying disability. Four states include deafness (Georgia, Kentucky, Virginia, Wyoming), and two states (Virginia and New York) include mental illness or developmental disabilities as qualifying disabilities.

== Europe ==
=== European Union / European Economic Area ===
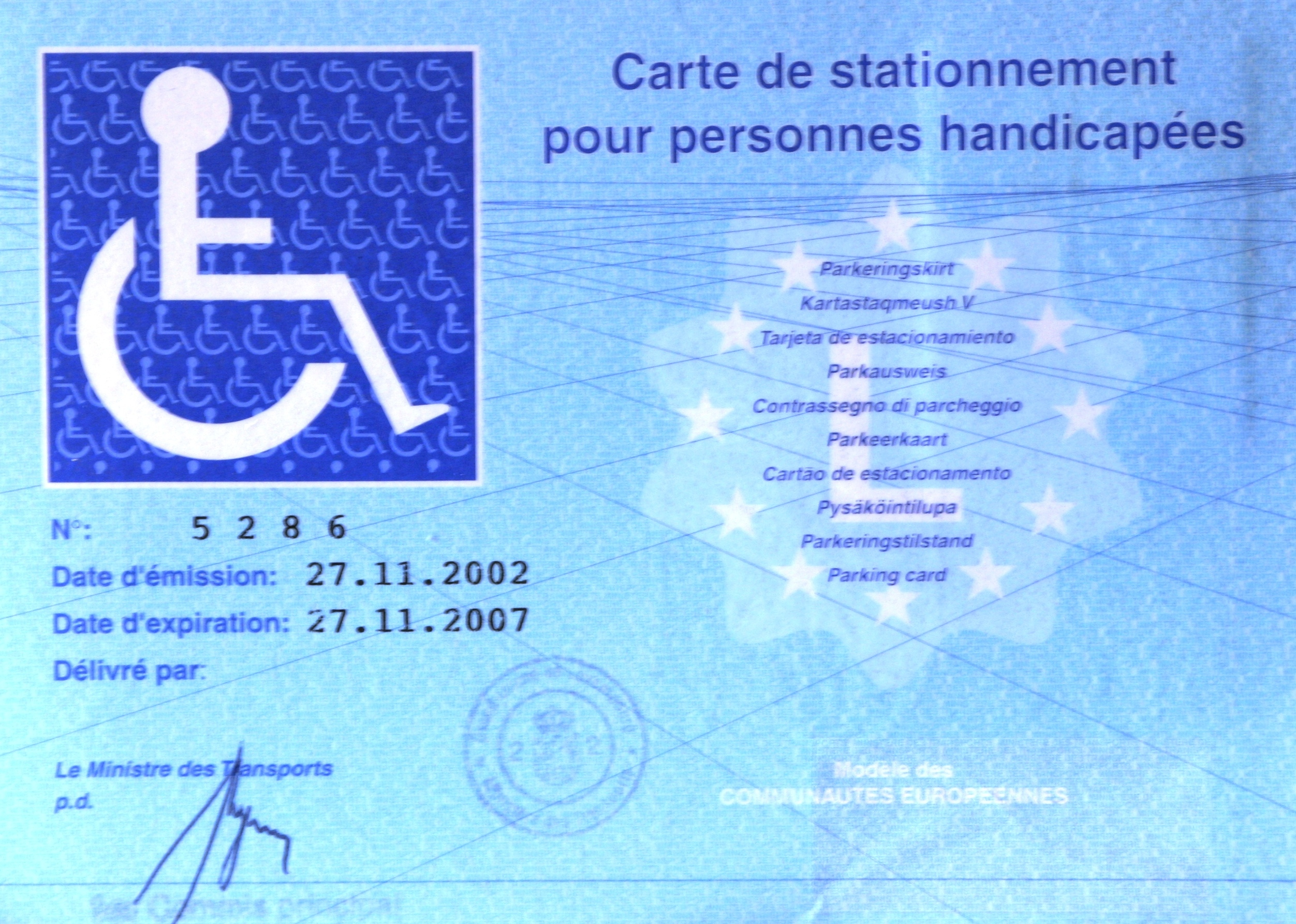
Disabled parking permit issued in Luxembourg, in the common EU format

In the European Union (EU), a disabled parking permit allows partial or total exemption from charges or penalties associated with the parking of a motor vehicle used by a badge-holder, and shows entitlement to use of dedicated parking bays and off-street parking (where they are provided). The concession extends in some places to partial or total exemption from tolls or general prohibitions on where a vehicle can be driven. Council recommendation 98/376/EC recommended that member states issue parking permits adhering to the standardised Community model, and that the permit should be recognized in other member states. The recommendation has since been amended by Council Recommendation 2008/205/EC. The recommendations are extended to the European Economic Area (EEA) through incorporation into the EEA Agreement.

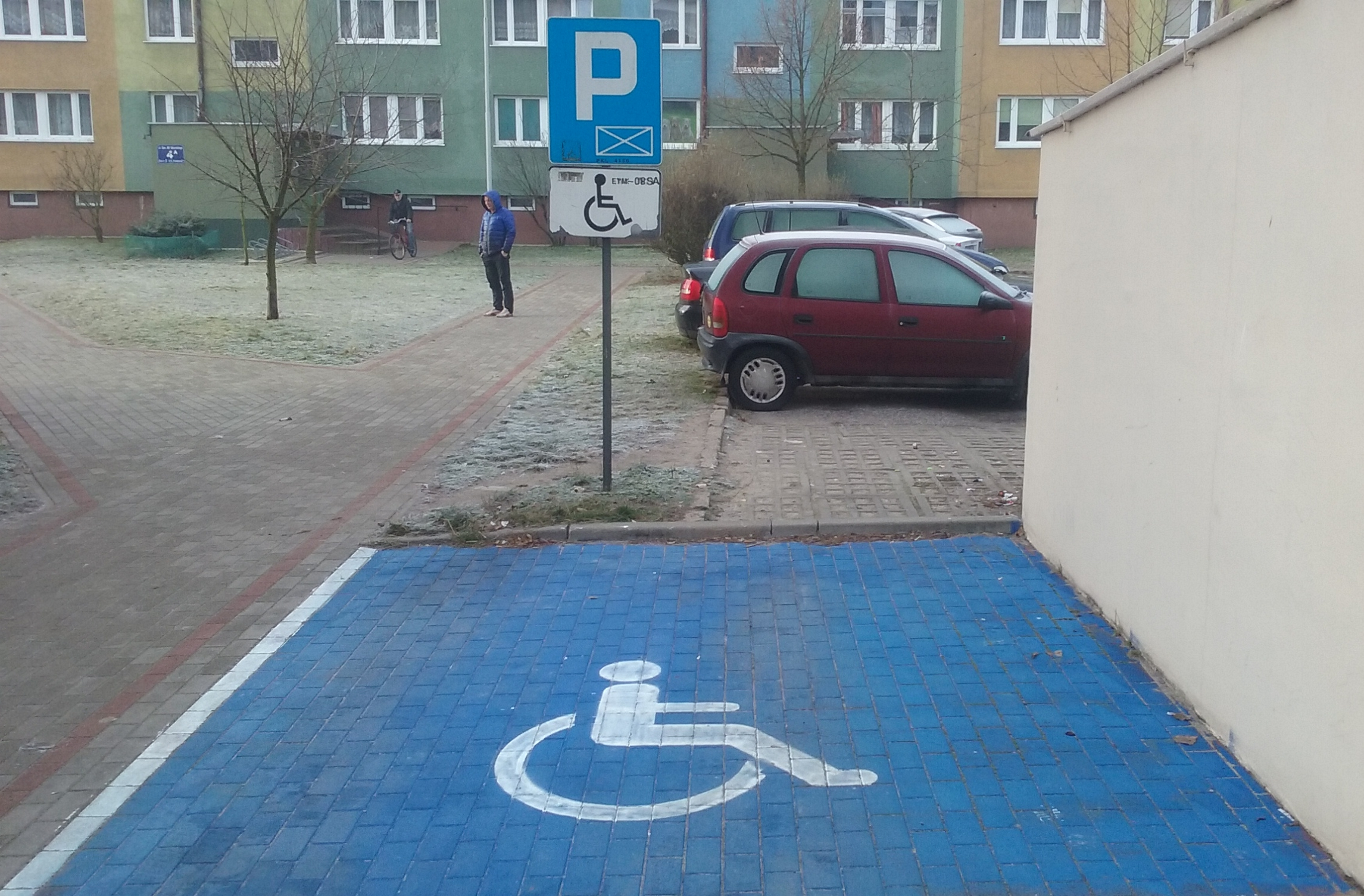
Disabled parking place in Tomaszów Mazowiecki, Poland

Since 2000, all general disabled parking permits in the EU have been standardised to a common style and blue colour, leading to the officially-used designation "Blue Badge". A Blue Badge issued in one country of the EU is generally given equal recognition in others with various exceptions as described for the countries below.

The privileges vary by area, but some include parking in no-parking zones, extended time limit on time-limited parking areas, waived parking fees, and using pedestrian areas in urgent situations.

=== United Kingdom ===
In the United Kingdom, this scheme of permits was originally introduced (using Orange Badges) by the Chronically Sick and Disabled Persons Act 1970. Badges are issued as a right if a person meets certain statutory requirements, most of which are associated with actually being in receipt of certain disability benefits from the national Social Security system; additionally, a local authority can make concessionary issues of badges to persons who have a permanent disability which does not fall directly within the more rigid statutory requirements but which seriously impairs their mobility.

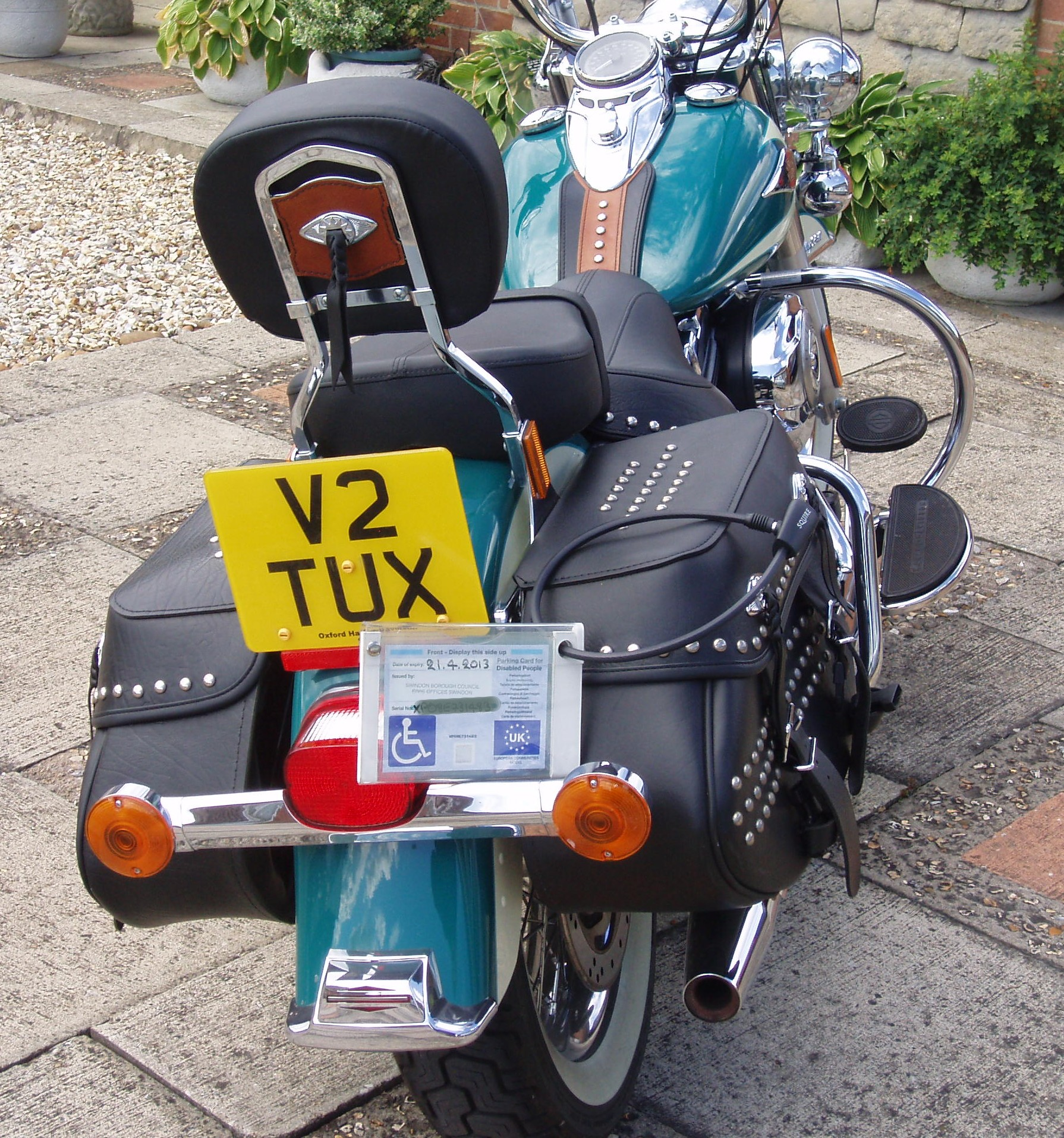
A UK "Blue Badge" Disabled Parking Permit in a custom permit holder for motorcycles, beside the license plate.

Great Britain's Blue Badge scheme does not apply to parking away from public roads and local authority car parks, with the general concessions often not recognised at ports, airports, and railway stations unless the operators have provided voluntary parking privileges.

Until 2010 Directgov provided a service that covered country-wide customised maps for Blue Badge Holders with different base colours reflecting councils' policies on Blue Badge parking. In addition to council policies, this service also pinpointed the location of different features specific to the disabled community. There are a few dedicated Blue Badge sat-navs available, mainly from the specialist company Navevo. Since the cessation of the directgov service, maps have been provided by online services.

Some local authorities may use their own information and resources to help provide information for Blue Badges users. Nottingham City uses a popular map base.

Misuse and abuse of Blue Badges in the UK can incur fines of up to £1,000. Between 1 April 2020 and 31 March 2021, prosecutions for misuse of the Blue Badge scheme were supported by specific or general policies in 74% of local authorities (110 authorities) in England. Of those without a policy, 50% were planning on implementing one in the future. In England, there were 698 reported prosecutions in the year ending March 2021, a drop of 49% in prosecuted badges that may have related to the effects of the coronavirus (COVID-19) pandemic on citizen behaviour, local authority enforcement practices, and resource availability.

Blue Badge fraud remains a significant issue, particularly in London, where the number of fines for misuse has risen in recent years. In 2023, 6,415 Penalty Charge Notices (PCNs) were issued for Blue Badge-related offences, a 25% increase from 5,132 in 2022.

In addition to enforcement by local authorities, investigations into Blue Badge fraud are carried out by the National Agency for Blue Badge Fraud Investigations (BBFI), which works with councils to detect and prevent misuse and prosecute those exploiting the scheme. BBFI has also been involved in raising awareness of Blue Badge theft, contributing to a parliamentary motion to address the issue and improve enforcement efforts.

Previously, the Department for Transport (DfT) was responsible for reporting Blue Badge fraud statistics. However, BBFI has now taken over the role of publishing and reviewing these statistics, providing up-to-date data on misuse and enforcement actions.

Disabled Persons' Parking Badges Act 2013
- Act of Parliament
- Parliament of the United Kingdom
- Long title: An Act to amend section 21 of the Chronically Sick and Disabled Persons Act 1970, and for connected purposes.
- Citation: 2013 c. 4
- Introduced by: Simon Kirby (Commons); Baroness Thomas of Winchester (Lords)
- Territorial extent: England and Wales; Scotland

Dates
- Royal assent: 31 January 2013
Other legislation
Amends	Chronically Sick and Disabled Persons Act 1970

Status: Current legislation

The Disabled Persons' Parking Badges Act 2013 (c. 4) gave a number of additional powers to local authorities and police to reduce fraudulent usage of Blue Badges.

==== England and Wales ====
In England and Wales, Blue Badge holders are required (unless signs show otherwise) to display a disabled person's parking disc ("clock"). When parking on yellow lines or in other places where there is a time restriction, a clock showing the time of arrival should be displayed. When parking on a no waiting restriction (yellow lines etc.) a maximum of three hours is permitted. The clock should be sent together with the Blue Badge. If not, a clock can be obtained from the same council that issued the badge.

The time clock must be displayed on the vehicle's dashboard or facia panel, so that the time can be seen clearly through the front windscreen. The clock should be set to show the quarter-hour period during which the car was parked. If there is no dashboard or facia panel in the vehicle, the clock must still be displayed in a place where it can be clearly read from outside the vehicle.

Badge holders from the European Union will need to obtain a clock (obtainable from their issuing office in the UK) to validate their badge; otherwise, the vehicle will be treated as if no badge were displayed.

Local differences in parking rules

In London, the volume of traffic has led to restrictions upon the national scheme in some areas with local colour schemes used to restrict standard concessions to local residents, for example the permits are green in Camden, white in Westminster, purple in Kensington and Chelsea, and red in the City of London. In these cities and boroughs, special rules and parking spaces are provided for Blue Badge holders.

Similar local schemes operate in other large towns or cities in the UK, for example, Norwich operates a 'green badge scheme'.

==== Northern Ireland ====
The standard scheme only generally applies to on-street parking and is outlined on the Roads Service Northern Ireland website. A "White Badge" is required for access to Pedestrian Zones.

==== Scotland ====
In Scotland, a local authority Parking Attendant (in addition to police and traffic wardens) has the power to inspect a Blue Badge; failure to allow this inspection is an offence. There are also proposals to extend the issue of badges to small children and a wider range of (temporarily or permanently) disabled people.

Disabled Persons' Parking Places (Scotland) Act 2009
- Act of the Scottish Parliament
- Scottish Parliament
- Long title: An Act of the Scottish Parliament to make provision about badges for display on motor vehicles used by disabled persons.
- Citation: 2009 asp 3
- Introduced by: Jackie Baillie

Dates
- Royal assent: 1 April 2009

Status: Current legislation

The Disabled Persons' Parking Places (Scotland) Act 2009 (asp 3) gives local councils the power to create a traffic regulation which would make it an offence to not display a blue badge in a disabled parking bay.

Disabled Persons' Parking Badges (Scotland) Act 2014
- Act of the Scottish Parliament
- Scottish Parliament
- Long title: An Act of the Scottish Parliament to make provision for the duties of local authorities in relation to parking places for use by disabled persons' vehicles; and for connected purposes.
- Citation: 2014 asp 17
- Introduced by: Jackie Baillie

Dates
- Royal assent: 24 September 2014

Status: Current legislation

The Disabled Persons' Parking Badges (Scotland) Act 2014 (asp 17) gave additional powers to the police and local authorities to seize blue badges if they were being misused.

== Oceania ==
=== Australia ===
In Australia, disabled parking permits are provided under the Australian Disability Parking Scheme, which was established in September 2010 to harmonise disability permits across Australia. Disabled parking permits are applied for through state and territory organisations, and rules for eligibility differ among jurisdictions. If someone else parks in a disabled zone, they will be fined by either police or the council. The application process for a disability parking permit typically involves submitting a medical assessment, proof of identity, and completing the required forms. Processing times and associated fees vary by state or territory.

== See also ==
- Adapted automobile
- Parking violation
