= Playing Out =

Playing Out is a Community Interest Company (CIC), an influential UK non-profit company founded in 2009 in Bristol by Alice Ferguson and Amy Rose. The organisation was founded in response to growing concerns that children had lost the freedom to play safely in their neighbourhood streets due to traffic, parental safety fears and the decline of informal outdoor play. It supports residents to organise temporary street closures creating 'play streets' so that children can play safely outside, a model that has spread nationally and influenced international practice.

As of March 2026, Playing Out is formally closed.

== History ==
The first street closure was trialled in Bristol in 2009 and later adopted by the city council. Playing Out CIC provides toolkits and legal guidance for communities and local authorities, enabling “play streets” through temporary traffic regulation orders. The approach has been replicated across hundreds of UK streets and featured in national and international media. By 2017, over 500 streets in the UK had played out, growing to over 1,650 street communities have ‘played out’ in over 100 different local authority areas across the UK.

== Evaluation ==
Independent evaluations funded by the Department of Health found children gained an average of 16 minutes of additional physical activity per play street session, with adults reporting stronger community ties. Peer-reviewed studies identify the model as a low-cost intervention for health and wellbeing.

== Policy ==
Playing Out representatives have given oral evidence to the UK Parliament, including the 2025 Levelling Up, Housing and Communities inquiry on children and the built environment. Campaigners and MPs have called for a statutory “play sufficiency duty” in England. Existing powers under the Road Traffic Regulation Act 1984 and Town Police Clauses Act 1847 already enable temporary play street closures, supported by government guidance issued in 2019.

At the UK Covid-19 Inquiry, Alice Ferguson, co-founder of Playing Out CIC, argued that government lockdown rules wrongly excluded children’s play as a form of exercise, which led to confusion and in some cases children being ordered indoors or fined. Playing Out had campaigned earlier in the pandemic for ministers to recognise play as essential, warning that restrictions such as playground closures were harming children’s wellbeing. The organisation also submitted written evidence to the inquiry, stating that the omission of play from early Covid rules caused widespread uncertainty and undermined children’s health and development.
