= Road signs in Austria =

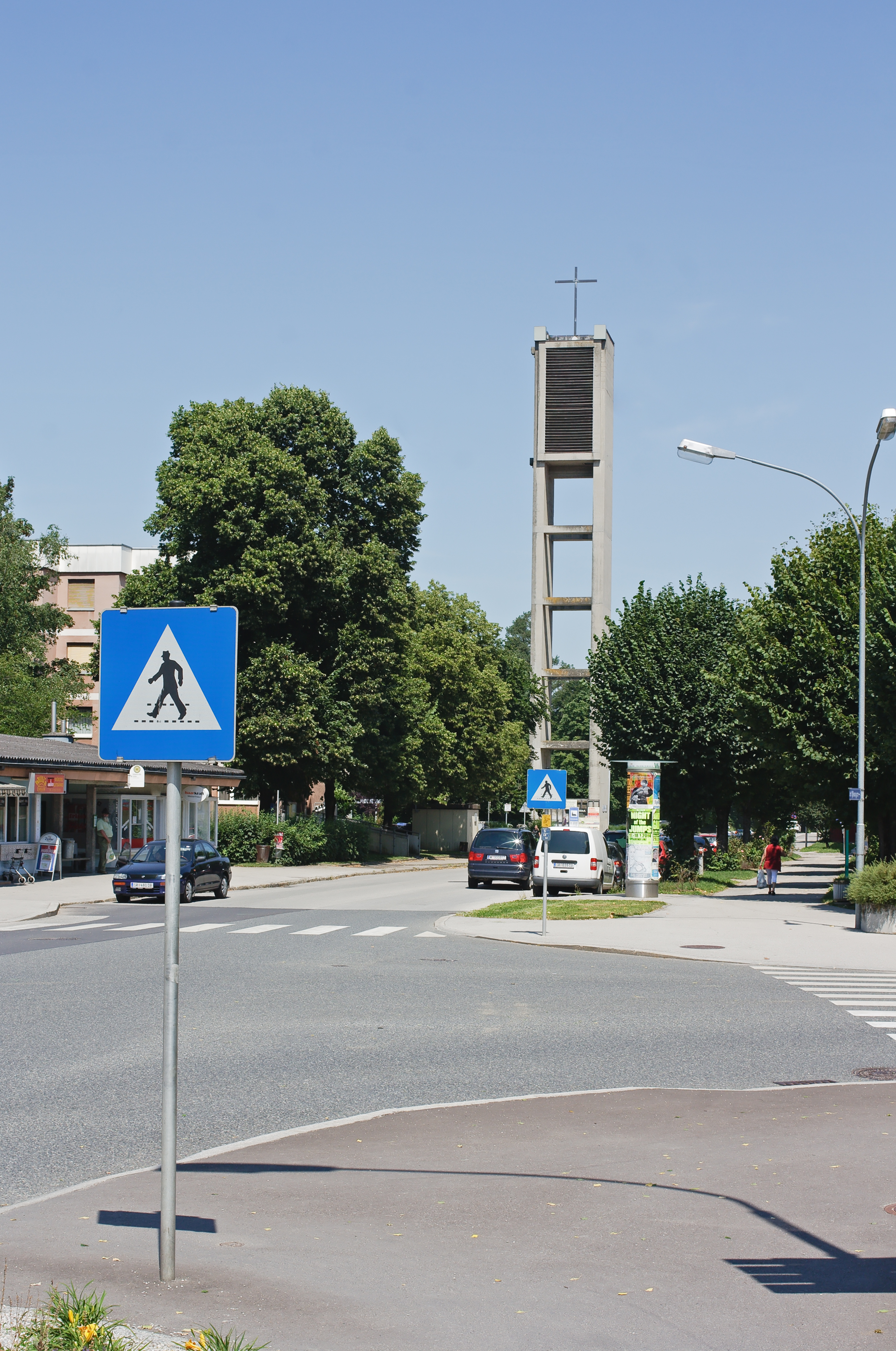
The signs of pedestrian crossing

Road signs in Austria are regulated in the Straßenverkehrsordnung (StVO).

Road signs are generally placed on the right side next to the road or above the road. Sometimes signs are also placed on both sides, in some exceptional cases signs are only place on the left or on one side (particularly town signs).

Austrian warning and prohibitory signs have a white background framed by red edges like most of the European road signs. However, Austria has a different No through road (dead end) - sign from most of the European countries. The sign seems to be a white inverted T and has no red stripe.

Austrian road signs depict people with realistic (as opposed to stylized) silhouettes.

The Vienna Convention on Road Signs and Signals, the country's original signatory, takes its name from the country's capital, Vienna. Austria signed the Vienna Convention on Road Signs and Signals on November 8, 1968, and ratified it on August 11, 1981.

Signs with text are set in the Tern typeface since 2013.

== General danger signals ==
1: Uneven road

2a: Dangerous curve to right

2b: Dangerous curve to left

2c: Dangerous curves, first to right

2d: Dangerous curves, first to left

3: Crossroad with priority to the right

3a: Roundabout

4: Crossroads with priority

5aL: Junction with priority (left)

5aR: Junction with priority (right)

6a: Level crossing with barriers

6b: Level crossing without barriers

6c: Level crossing mark (left) - Distance to level crossing approx. 80m

6c: Level crossing mark (right) - Distance to level crossing approx. 80m

6c: Level crossing mark (left) - Distance to level crossing approx. 160m

6c: Level crossing mark (right) - Distance to level crossing approx. 160m

6c: Level crossing mark (left) - Distance to level crossing approx. 240m

6c: Level crossing mark (right) - Distance to level crossing approx. 240m

Level crossing without barrier in approx. 240m

Level crossing with barrier in approx. 240m

Level crossing without barrier in approx. 240m

6d: Andreaskreuz: Indicates a single-track level crossing

6d: Andreaskreuz: Indicates a multitrack level crossing

6d: Single-track level crossing (Andreaskreuz)

6d: Multitrack level crossing (Andreaskreuz)

6d: Andreaskreuz (sideward)

6d: Andreaskreuz (sideward)

7: Steep hill downwards

7a: Steep hill upwards

8a: Road narrows on both sides

8b: Road narrows from left side

8c: Road narrows from right side

9: Road works

10: Slippery road

10a: Crosswind

10b: Falling rocks

10c: Low-flying aircraft

11: Pedestrian crossing

11a: Cyclist crossing

12: Children

13a: Animals (cow)

13b: Animals (deer)

14: Two-way traffic

14a: Motorist driving against the traffic on motorways

15: Traffic signals

16: Other dangers

== Prohibitory signs ==
1: Closed to all vehicles in both directions

2: No entry

3a: No left turn

3b: No right turn

3c: No U-turns

4a: No overtaking

4b: End of overtaking restriction

4c: No overtaking by lorries

4d: End of overtaking by lorries restriction

5: Duty of wait by oncoming traffic (give priority to vehicles from the opposite direction)

6a: No power-driven vehicles except single-tracked motorcycles

6b: No single-tracked motorcycles

6c: No power-driven vehicles

6d: No power-driven vehicles drawing a trailer

7a: No lorries

7a No lorries having a weight exceeding ... tonnes

7a No lorries exceeding ... meters

7b: No lorries drawing a trailer

7c: No animal-drawn vehicles

7e: No vehicles carrying dangerous goods

7f: No omnibuses

8a: No cycles or mopeds

8b: No mopeds

8c: No cycles

9a: No vehicles having an overall width exceeding ... meters

9b: No vehicles having an overall height exceeding ... meters

9c: No vehicles exceeding ... tonnes laden weight

9d: No vehicles having a weight exceeding ... tonnes on one axle

10a: Speed limit (allowed maximum speed)

10b: End of speed limit

11: End of overtaking-restriction & speed limit

11a: Zone limitation

11b: End of zone limitation

12: Stop for customs

13a: No parking

13b: No standing or parking

13c/a: Alternative parking - No parking on uneven days

13c/b: Alternative parking - No parking on even days

13d: Beginning of a short-term parking zone

13e: End of a short-term parking zone

14: Prohibition of horn sounding

14a: Riding prohibited

14b: Pedestrians prohibited

== Mandatory signs ==
15: Prescribed direction: Left only

15: Prescribed direction: Right only

15: Prescribed direction: Straight ahead only

15: Prescribed direction: Turn left

15: Prescribed direction: Turn right

15: Prescribed direction: Turn left or continue straight ahead

15: Prescribed direction: Turn right or continue straight ahead

15: Prescribed direction: Turn left or right

15: Prescribed direction: Follow lane on the left side

15: Prescribed direction: Follow lane on the right side

15a: Prescribed direction for transport with dangerous goods

16: Track for cyclists & roller-skaters

16a: End of track for cyclists & roller-skaters

17: Footpath - Track only for pedestrians

17a: Track only for cycles & pedestrians

17a-b: Track only for cycles & pedestrians (separated tracks)

17a-c: End of Track only for cycles & pedestrians

17a- d: End of Track only for cycles & pedestrians (separated tracks)

17b: Track only for horse riders

17c: End of footpath - Track only for pedestrians

18: Pedestrian underpass

19: Prescribed minimum speed

19a: End of prescribed minimum speed limit

21: U-turn is prescribed

22: Obligation to put on snow chains

22a: End of obligation to put on snow chains

== Priority signs ==
23: Give way

24: Stop

25a: Priority road

25a: End of priority road

== Informational signs ==
1a: Parking lot or parking lane

1b: Parking lot

1c: Breakdown bay

2: Hospital

2a: Pedestrian crossing

2b: Cyclist crossing

2c: Pedestrian and cyclist crossing

2c: Cyclist and pedestrian crossing

3: First aid

3a: Church services

4: Break-down service

5: Telephone

6: Gas station

6a: Taxi stand

7: End of two-way traffic

7a: Oncoming traffic must give way

8a: Beginning of Motorway

8b: End of Motorway

8c: Motorroad

8d: End of Motorroad

9a: Pedestrian zone

9b: End of pedestrian zone

9c: Residential street

9d: End of a residential street

9e: Residential mixed traffic area

9f: End of residential mixed traffic area

9g: Tunnel

10: One-way traffic (left)

10: One-way traffic (right)

10a: On red or yellow traffic light, trams turn into the following direction

11: No through road (dead end)

12: Street lights that are not turned on for the whole night

13a Direction sign

13a Direction sign

13b: Direction sign

13b: Direction sign

13b: Direction sign

13c: Direction sign to other transportation infrastructure

13d: Direction sign to local destination or destination area.

14a: Direction sign for an upcoming junction to a Motorway or Motorroad

14b: Direction sign to Motorway or Motorroad (right)

14b: Direction sign to Motorway or Motorroad (diagonal right)

15a-a: Direction sign for an upcoming Motorway or Motorroad exit

15a-b: Direction sign for an upcoming Motorway or Motorroad exit

15a-c: Direction sign for an upcoming Motorway or Motorroad exit

15a-d: Direction sign for an upcoming Motorway or Motorroad exit

15b-a: Exit sign - Motorway or Motorroad

15b-b portrait: Exit sign - Motorway or Motorroad

15b-b landscape: Exit sign - Motorway or Motorroad

15c: Orientation sign – Motorway or Motorroad

16a: Warning of an upcoming diversion

16b: Diversion to a town (destination)

16b: Diversion

16b: Diversion (for lorries)

16c-a: Change of lane directions/Oncoming lanes will come to an end in ... m

16c-b: Change of lane directions/Oncoming lanes will come to an end in ... m

17a: Town sign

17b: Town area ends

18: International arterial

19: Street with the right-of-way

21: Street without the right-of-way

22: General speed limits in Austria

23: Prescribed direction

23a: Prescribed direction

23a: Prescribed direction

23b: Two lanes merge into one in my driving direction

23b: Two lanes ahead in my driving direction

23c: Lanes merge

24: Road reserved for buses

25: Lane reserved for city buses

26: Road reserved for bicycle

27: Bicycle path

28a: Pedestrian and bicycle path (shared)

28b: Pedestrian and bicycle path (separated)

== Additional auxiliary signs ==
b: Length

c: STOP sign announcement

d: Crossroad is a priority road

e: Defined course of a priority road

f: In case of snow ice buildup on road

g: In case of rainfall

h: Except (people using wheelchairs)

i: Except (motor tractors, power-driven working vehicles)

j: Tow-away zone

k: Only for this lane

l: Only for lane, on the left side of median

m: Except for electrical vehicle during charging

== Further signs ==
School bus sign - schoolchildren transportation (Austria)

== Retired signs ==
=== Road signs of 1945 ===
Danger

Uneven road

Series of bends

Crossroad

Level crossing with barriers

Level crossing without barriers

Yield

Stop

No vehicles

Do not enter

No motor vehicles with more than three wheels

No motorcycles

No motor vehicles

No cycling

Height limit

Width limit

Weight limit

Weight limit for motor vehicles

Speed limit

No stopping

No parking

No overtaking

No honking

Customs

Mandatory direction

Parking

Caution

Bicycle path

First aid

Priority road

=== Road signs of 1960 ===
==== Warning signs ====
Rough road

Right curve

Left curve

Double right curve

Double left curve

Crossroad

Crossroad with priority

Yield

Railroad crossing with gates

Railroad crossing without gates

Railroad crossing countdown marker

Railroad crossing countdown marker

Railroad crossing countdown marker

Railroad crossing countdown marker

Single crossbuck

Double crossbuck

Single crossbuck

Double crossbuck

Downhill grade

Road narrows

Roadworks

Slippery road

Pedestrian crossing

Children

Cattle

Deer

Two-way traffic

Other Danger

==== Regulatory signs ====
No vehicles

Do not enter

No left turn

No right turn

Do not pass

End of do not pass

Yield to oncoming traffic

No motor vehicles except motorcycles

No motorcycles

No motor vehicles

No trucks

No vehicles with trailers

No horse carts

No mopeds and cycling

No mopeds

No cycling

Width limit

Height limit

Weight limit

Axle weight limit

Speed limit

Speed limit ends

Stop

Customs

Limited stopping or parking

No honking

Mandatory driving direction

Cycle path

Footpath

==== Information signs ====
Parking

Parking direction

Hospital

First Aid station

Repair service

Telephone

Fuel station

One-way traffic

Priority over oncoming traffic

Highway

Highway ends

Priority road

Priority road ends

One-way traffic (left)

One-way traffic (right)

Dead end

== See also ==
- Transport in Austria
- Road signs in Germany
