= Austria (typeface) =

Grotesque sans-serif typeface

Autobahn sign with destinations indicated using Austria narrow

Autobahn sign with destinations indicated using Austria medium

Austria was the typeface formerly used on all official road signage in Austria made prior to 2010. A modified version of its German counterpart DIN 1451, it came in narrow- and medium-width fonts. Since 2010 it has been replaced on all new road signs by the more recently developed Tern typeface.

== See also ==
- List of public signage typefaces
