= Play street =

Street designed for playful activities

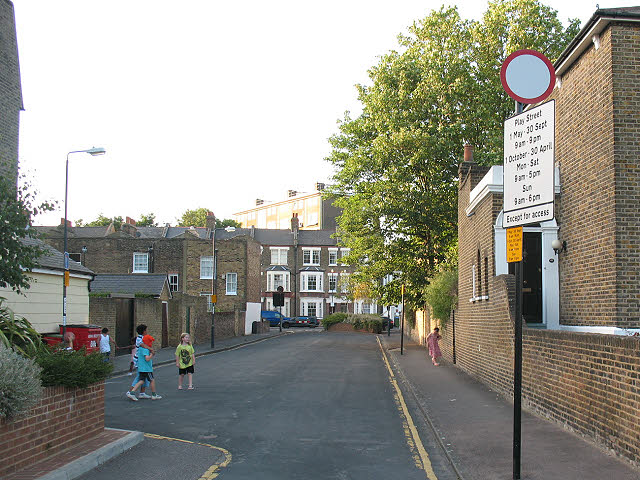
Ashburnham Retreat, play street

A play street is a road temporarily closed to motor traffic to create a safe space for children's play and community activities. Unlike home zones or other permanent traffic-calming schemes, play streets are time-limited interventions, usually initiated by residents or local authorities. They have been introduced in cities around the world as a response to declining outdoor play, rising car use, and public health concerns.

== History ==
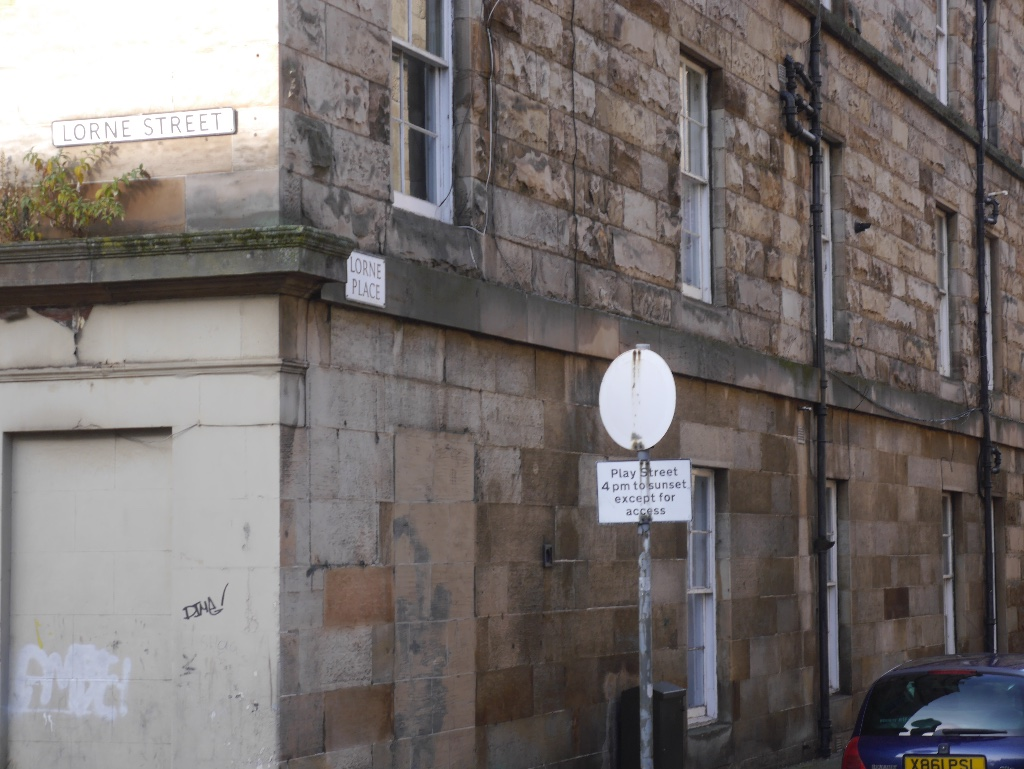
Play street sign, Lorne Place

The idea of closing streets for play dates back to the early 20th century. In the 1930s, British and American cities experimented with residential road closures to protect children from traffic. In New York, “play streets” were designated during the summer months, while similar schemes were piloted in London and Newcastle. Post-war car ownership reduced informal street play, but community-led closures re-emerged in the late 20th and early 21st centuries.

== Implementation ==
Play streets are typically authorised under traffic regulation laws that allow temporary road closures. They may be organised as one-off events, such as Open Streets or Ciclovía programmes, or as recurring community-led sessions. Activities usually include free play, cycling, games, and social interaction, supervised by residents. Local governments often provide guidance and signage, while community groups manage stewarding and communication.

== International examples ==
In the United States, New York City has operated summer “play streets” since the 1910s, often linked to schools or community organisations. Comparable closures take place in other cities as part of Summer Streets and Open Streets programmes.

In Latin America, Bogotá’s Ciclovía, begun in the 1970s, closes large sections of roads every Sunday for walking, cycling, and play. The model has since spread widely across the region.

In Europe, Dutch and Belgian municipalities support speelstraten (play streets), with temporary closures during school holidays.

In the United Kingdom, a resident-led model was pioneered in Bristol in 2009 and became the basis for Playing Out CIC, a non-profit supporting national adoption of play streets. Independent evaluations found the approach increased children's physical activity and strengthened community cohesion.
