= Disc parking =

System for regulating parking

European standard parking disc

Disc parking (alternatively spelled disk parking) is a system of allowing time-restricted free parking through display of a parking disc, which shows the time at which the vehicle was parked on a clock face. A patrolling parking attendant can inspect the disc to check whether payment is owed. The system is common in Europe.

The original system had been introduced along with establishing a blue zone area. The blue zones in the city-centers allow for free parking of about 2 hours by using a parking disc issued by the city while other parking zones may have stricter control by parking meters. The current unified EU parking disc regulations allow for a wider range of time restrictions that are indicated on the signs.

== Procedure ==
German sign-combination; the lower sign indicates disk-parking with two-hour limit

Upon arrival at a parking lot requiring parking disc, the parking disc is set and put on display behind the front windshield. The disc has a thumb wheel (or knurling-wheel) at the upper side that makes the clock face turn around its centre point, allowing it to show different clock times. The standard parking clock can show a full twelve hours, with additional marks for each half-hour. The time to be set is rounded up from the actual arrival time, for example a 10:00:01 arrival would be set to 10:30, while a 10:29:59 arrival would also be set to 10:30. The legal requirements are that "parking is allowed when the vehicle shows a parking disc that is easily readable from the outside and whose clock-hand points to the mark of the half hour that follows the time of arrival".

The latest departure-time is calculated from the displayed arrival-time on the parking disc based on the indicated maximum parking-time. For example, if the parking disc was set to 10:30 and the parking-sign indicated a one-hour maximum parking time, then free parking would end at 11:30. The system is intentionally set up in a way that only full and half hours are used to indicate arrival and departure. Arriving at 10:02 in a parking disc zone of one hour maximum parking-time invokes a departure time of 11:30, and hence an effective time interval of 88 minutes for free parking after arrival. In short, if the parking-sign shows a limit of one hour maximum parking-time, then the effective maximum parking-time is 61 to 90 minutes because the difference to the next half hour is added.

Drivers risk getting a ticket (if a parking enforcement officer arrives before the beginning of the indicated interval) if they set the arrival time too far into the future in an attempt to extend the allowed departure time. Drivers can, however, surreptitiously change the time on the disc before it expires, risking discovery only if an enforcement officer is nearby at the time or if the car had been previously noted by said officer.

== Access ==
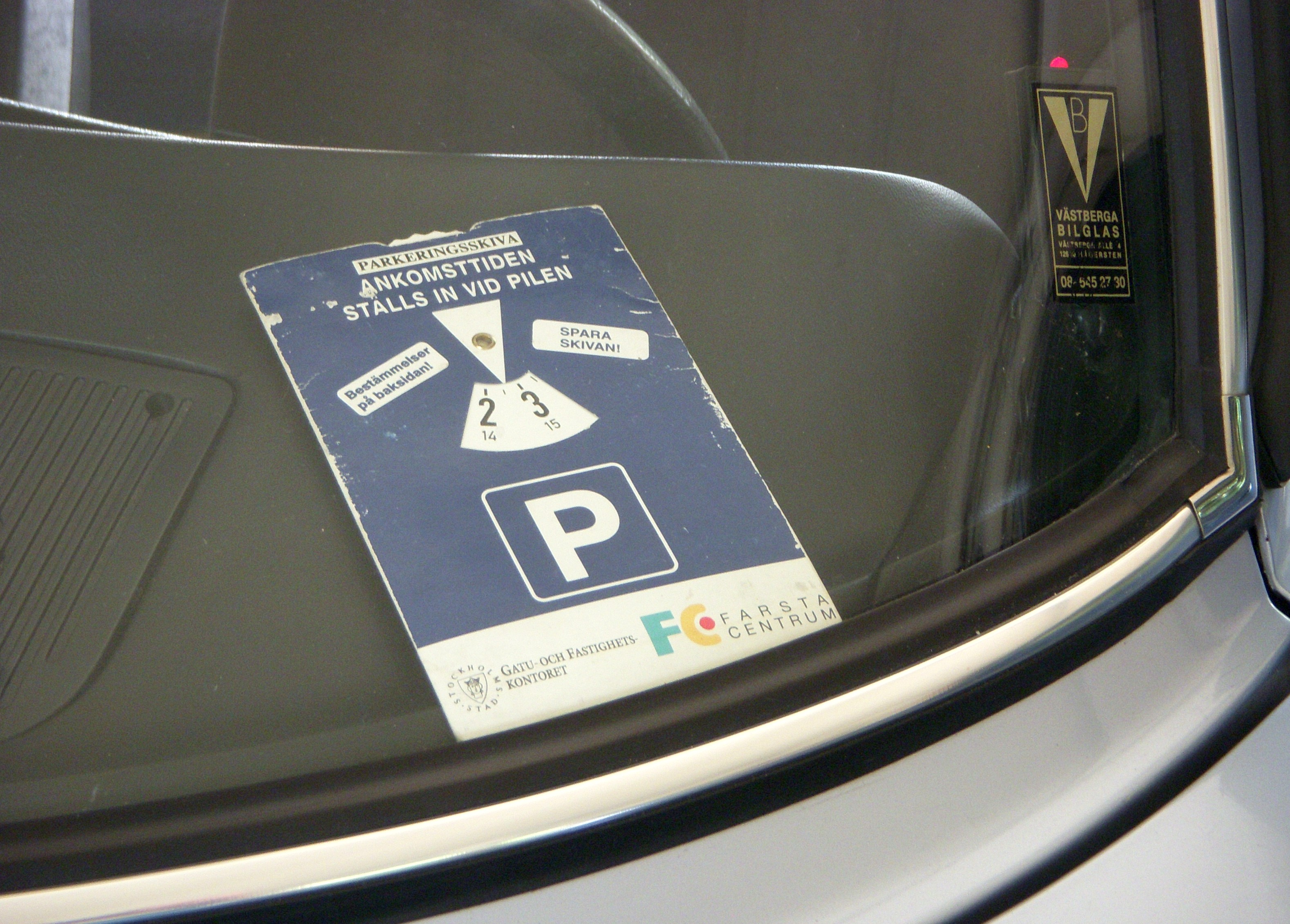
Example display of a parking disc

Parking discs can be obtained from filling station shops, and many gift and card shops also sell parking discs. The cheap paper parking discs sell for less than one euro. Large European car rental companies such as Europcar and Sixt lend their vehicles equipped with a parking disc. These are commonly left in places such as the two side bags in the front doors and the inside of the cover of the car log book.

Although the design and size of parking discs has been standardized there are often free giveaways with advertisements on the rear. Most parking discs are made of heavy paper. A common variant is made of plastic with sharp edges that can be used as an ice scraper. An illegal variation involves motorized clock discs that move the clock face in a timely manner, in an attempt to get indefinite free parking. In general, clock discs must be set with the arrow pointing to a mark and not any of the white space between, or else it would be invalid and could result in a traffic ticket.

Within Europe only the United Kingdom and Denmark have a disabled persons parking scheme where a parking disc is required in certain circumstances. The UK administration offers a variation of the parking disc design that includes the International Symbol of Access wheelchair logo, and a blue clock face in line with the EU blue badge system introduced in 2000.

== History ==
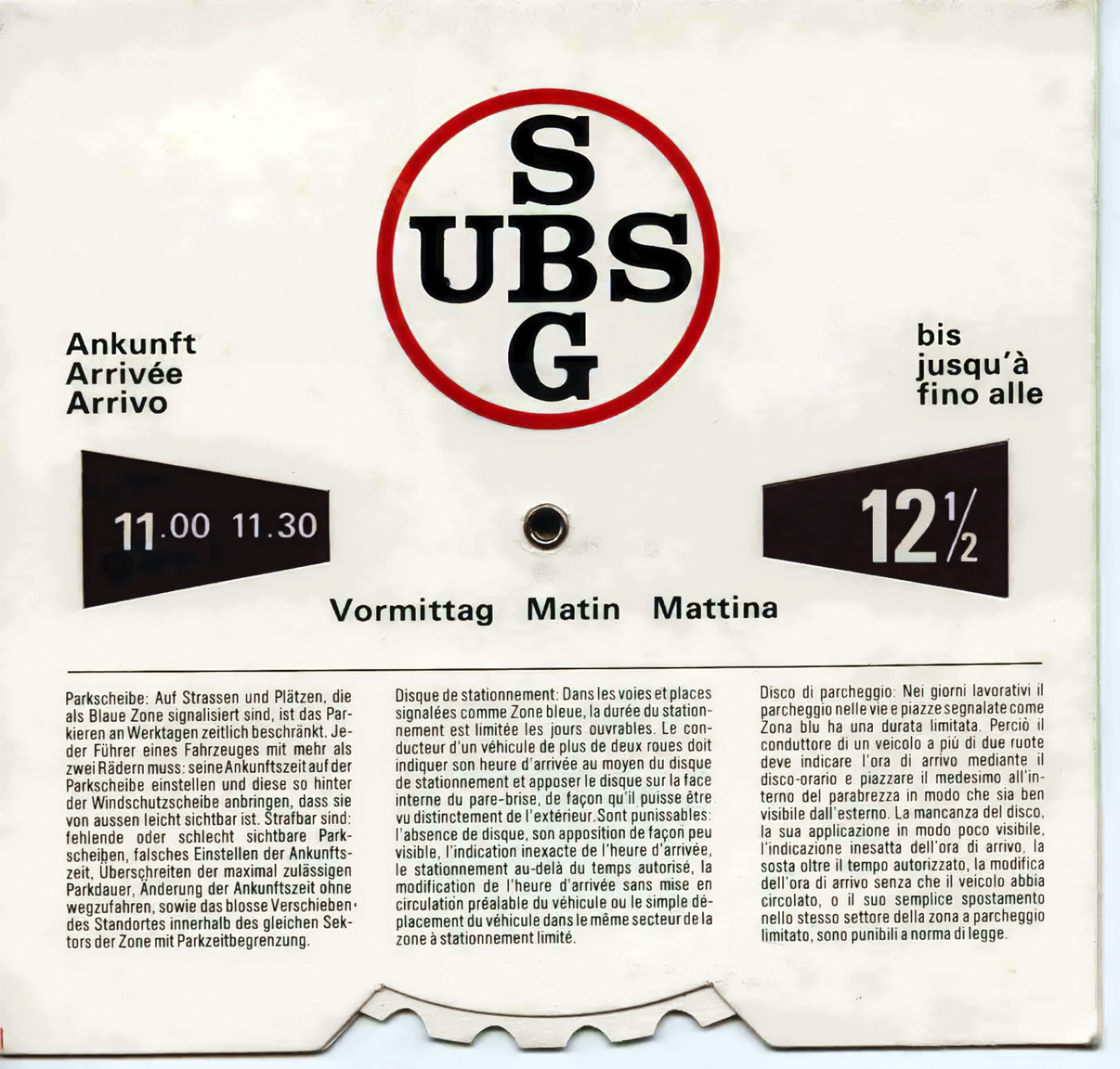
Swiss parking disc (early 70s). Selected arrival time shows at the left window, departure at the right. Other side of disc is used for afternoon parking. Disc was a sales promotion for UBS bank.

Disc parking was first introduced in Paris in 1957 and with a disc, developed in Vienna, in the town of Vienna beginning 1959, adopted in Kassel in 1961—in both cases the new parking system was introduced in an attempt to move away long-term parkers without erecting parking meters, which was considered too expensive. The concept proved to be effective and it spread throughout European countries in the 1960s. The first parking discs showed two clock faces—one with the arrival time and one with the departure time. Over time different variations of parking discs were created, including the Swiss variant that allowed for a fifteen-hour maximum parking time.

A driver new to the system can get confused when not being informed about proper usage. For example, when Switzerland switched to the European-wide blue parking disc system, the "blue zones" in Basel were marked with "1 hour" signs that previously read "1 1/2 hours", giving the impression that the time was reduced, but in fact it had not been. Another common error is when an overseas tourist might set the clock to the mark just preceding the current arrival time, which can make a one-hour parking zone as short as thirty minutes, possibly resulting in an unjustified parking ticket.

On March 31, 1979 the conference of ministers of transportation in the European Union decided that a European standard should only use designs with a single clock face. The standardized clock disc was introduced as federal law in Germany in November 1981, and similar designs were adopted in other European countries. From 1998 the old parking disc designs began to be abolished. France set the last date to 2007, while in Switzerland (not an EU member) the EU parking disc design was introduced in 2000 and the old designs abolished in 2003.

Modern parking signs demanding disc parking include a pictogram of the standardized EU parking disc along with a number showing the maximum parking time in hours.

== Local regulations ==
=== France ===
The disc parking scheme was invented in Paris in the 1950s. The number of vehicles in the capital region had increased considerably from 400,000 in 1938 to as many as 920,000 at the end of 1955. On September 19, 1955 the police prefect ordered to tow off cars that were parked illegally. Parallel investigations began into the problem, which the prefect described in a publication on 16 January 1956.

Dans l'agglomération parisienne certaines règles ont été fixées pour le stationnement des véhicules : celui-ci peut s'effectuer des deux côtés dans les rues larges, d'un seul côté si le stationnement bilatéral ne permet pas à deux files de voitures de circuler simultanément, cette disposition s'appliquant également dans les voies où la circulation s'effectue à sens unique. Il est totalement interdit dans les rues étroites ou sur certains points particuliers signalés à l'attention (disques, grès rouges) ou bien connus (arrêts d'autobus, stations de taxis, etc.).

L'expérience montre que l'inobservation de ces règles est l'une des principales causes des difficultés que l'on rencontre pour circuler. Une récente étude des contraventions relevées pour stationnement irrégulier vient de révéler que la plupart des conducteurs fautifs savaient pertinemment qu'ils étaient en infraction, mais préféraient courir le risque d'un procès-verbal plutôt que de garer leur véhicule loin de leur domicile ou de leur bureau. Aussi le Préfet de Police a-t-il décidé de faire appliquer strictement la réglementation relative au stationnement.

Les premiers efforts de ses services porteront sur les voies très empruntées, où la satisfaction de quelques commodités particulières est en réalité une méconnaissance totale de l'intérêt général...

— ordonnance du Préfet de Police

He had already started a parking experiment in November 1955 - parking on the Champs-Élysées avenue was limited to 1 hour. In order to control the maximum parking time small pieces of paper were stuck on the outer ring of the tire with the color of the paper changing every hour. This made for an effective parking time between 1 hour to about 1 hour 55 minutes.

Additionally investigations on charging meter options were started in July 1955. The experiments, interrogations and studies lasted well into 1957 when the first "zone bleue" (blue zone) was installed in the East of Paris center (north of the Seine with boundaries at Place de l'Étoile, Gare du Nord and Louvre) that became obligatory on 1 October. Similarly to the test on the Champs-Élysées it imposed a maximum of 1 hour however it used another method of control: the prefect René Genebrier had accepted the proposal from engineer Robert Thiebault to use a device with a clock face that were to be set by the car driver to the time of arrival. The clock disc had two windows where one would show the hour of arrival and the other the hour of departure. The actual device had two clock faces - one for am time and the other for pm times.

This disc parking scheme was formally commenced 29 February 1960 by the Ministre de l'Intérieur. The blue zones were expanded at the time with a duration of one and a half hours in general.

French parking disc since 2007

The EU parking disc regulation was skipped in France for a long time where a general time limit of 1 hour 30 was the only regulation in effect. The EU parking disc however allows a much wider range of parking regulations which were tested first in Bron at the beginning of January 2001 when a new tramway line reached the city center. The Franklin Roosevelt Avenue was switched to a maximum of 30 minutes at the time that would a require a different clock disc. Finally the EU parking disc was officially introduced into the road statutory on 19 October 2007.

On 6 December 2007 the Ministry of the Interior implemented a regulation on a parking disc that would only have one window to show the arrival time. This new parking disc differs somewhat from the EU parking disc - it is colored in brown tone (EU disc is blue), it is square with 150 mm on each side (EU disc is rectangular) and the marks on the clock face are set in intervals of ten minutes.

However, discs sold in other EU member states are valid in France.

=== Switzerland ===
Many cities in Switzerland borrowed the blue zone concept in the same way as in France with a maximum time of 1 h 30. In cities like Basel the blue zones meant that parking lots were marked with blue lines where the scheme would be effective while other (non blue) parking lots were free. No other signposting was used in these blue zones to mark the controlled space - instead the parking discs showed the regulations on the back side.

A later development in Switzerland was the introduction of red zones allowing for a maximum of 15 hours. This scheme required another parking disc that would allow for 24 hours to be shown.

The EU-parking disc design was introduced in 2000 and the old designs abolished in 2003. This gave rise to some confusion among car drivers since the old parking regulations denoted "1:30 h" of maximum parking time while the new parking regulations imposed a limit of "1 hour". Since this time is rounded up to the next half of an hour there was no real difference however. The blue zone parking lots were kept however in the same way as before so that the new disc parking scheme reads as follows:

Arrival time	Parking time
08:00 - 11:30	1 hour
13:30 - 18:00	1 hour

This regulation is not mandatory on Sundays and national holidays. Effectively the actual legal parking time in the blue zone differs widely - arriving at 11:30 allows for legal parking up to 14:30 (about 3 hours) and arriving on Saturday at 17:31 allows for parking up to Monday 08:00 (more than 38 hours)

The blue zone parking regulations are effective continuously i.e. they are not restricted to the time span of the arrival time - a parking disc must always be used when parking a car in the blue zone (unlike in other countries where a parking disc does not need to be used outside the indicated times). The police regulations set the parking scheme as follows:

Bei jedem in einer Blauen Zone parkierten Fahrzeug muss eine Parkscheibe gut sichtbar angebracht werden. Fahrzeuge dürfen an Werktagen (Montag bis Samstag) zwischen 8.00 und 11.30 Uhr sowie zwischen 13.30 und 18.00 Uhr eine Stunde in der Blauen Zone parkiert werden. Bei einer Ankunftszeit zwischen 11.30 und 13.30 Uhr gilt die Parkerlaubnis bis 14.30 Uhr. Bei einer Ankunftszeit zwischen 18.00 und 8.00 Uhr bis 9.00 Uhr. Zwischen 19.00 und 7.59 Uhr muss die Parkscheibe nicht angebracht werden, sofern das Fahrzeug vor 8.00 Uhr wieder in den Verkehr eingefügt wird.
In the blue zone every parked vehicle must show a parking disc. On weekdays (Monday through Saturday) vehicles may be parked for one hour between 8:00 and 11:30 as well as between 13:30 and 18:00. With an arrival time between 11:30 and 13:30 the parking allowance is valid until 14:30. With an arrival time between 18:00 and 8:00 [it is valid] until 09:00. Between 19:00 and 7:59 a parking disc does not need to be shown provided that the vehicle enters traffic before 08:00.

=== Germany ===
German parking disc of 1981

The city of Kassel was the first to take over the French regulation on parking discs in Germany. The concept spread quickly as it was supported by the powerful ADAC automobile club – it was considered the better alternative over charging meters as disc parking is free of charge.

After the EU level had asked for a common parking disc with a single clock face in 1979 it was Germany to introduce a new design in November 1981 already – the "Verkehrsblattverlautbarung Nr. 237 vom 24. Nov. 1981" did specify a blue rectangle of 150 mm height and 110 mm width. The clock face has a mark per each half of an hour and the car drivers are required to put the clock-hand on the mark. Germany's neighbouring countries would adopt the same design in the following decades that would eventually be the design chose for the EU parking disc.

=== Austria ===
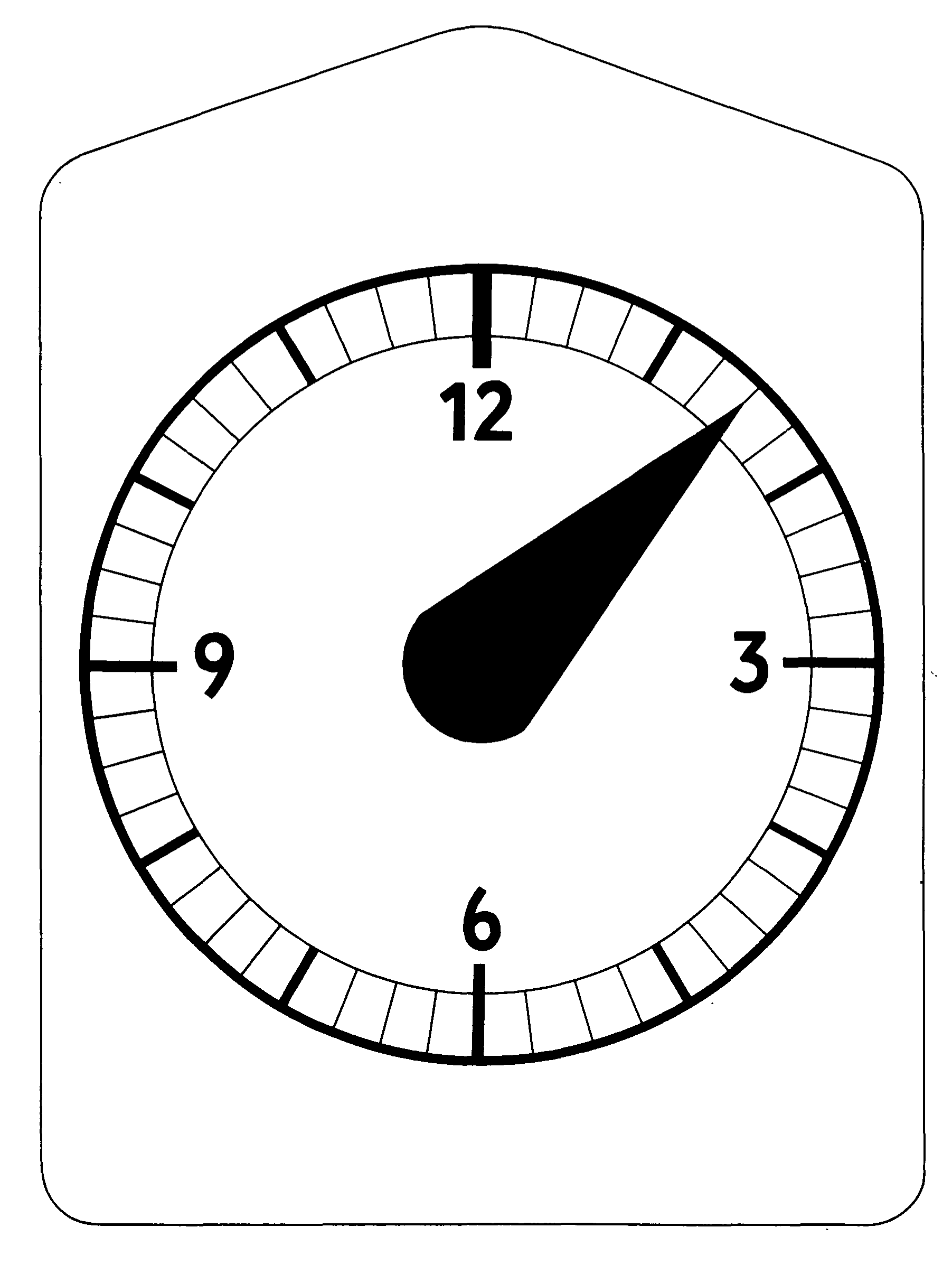
Austrian parking disc of 1994

While Salzburg took over the parking disc from Paris there was also another variant in Vienna. The city introduced a parking disc on 16 March 1959 that had a single clock face with a clock hand with two marks that were exactly on hour away. When the black mark of the clock hand was set to the time of arrival on the clock face the red mark would point to the time of departure. This design was introduced by the director of urban planning Aladar Pecht so that it would also be nicknamed "Pechtscheibe" (Pecht-Disk).

The introduction of the EU parking disc in 1994 came about with a little variation as it required to set the mark to the next quarter of an hour:(§ 4 Abs. 3)

Der Zeiger hat die Ankunftszeit anzuzeigen, wobei auf die dem Zeitpunkt des Abstellens folgende volle Viertelstunde aufgerundet werden kann.

— (Bgbl. 854 vom 4. November 1994, gleichlautend bis dato).

Consequently, the parking disc design has four marks per hour instead of two (see appendix 1 in the statutory regulation of 1994). The German/EU parking discs are commonly accepted however when they are set correctly to the next quarter of the hour.

=== Sweden ===
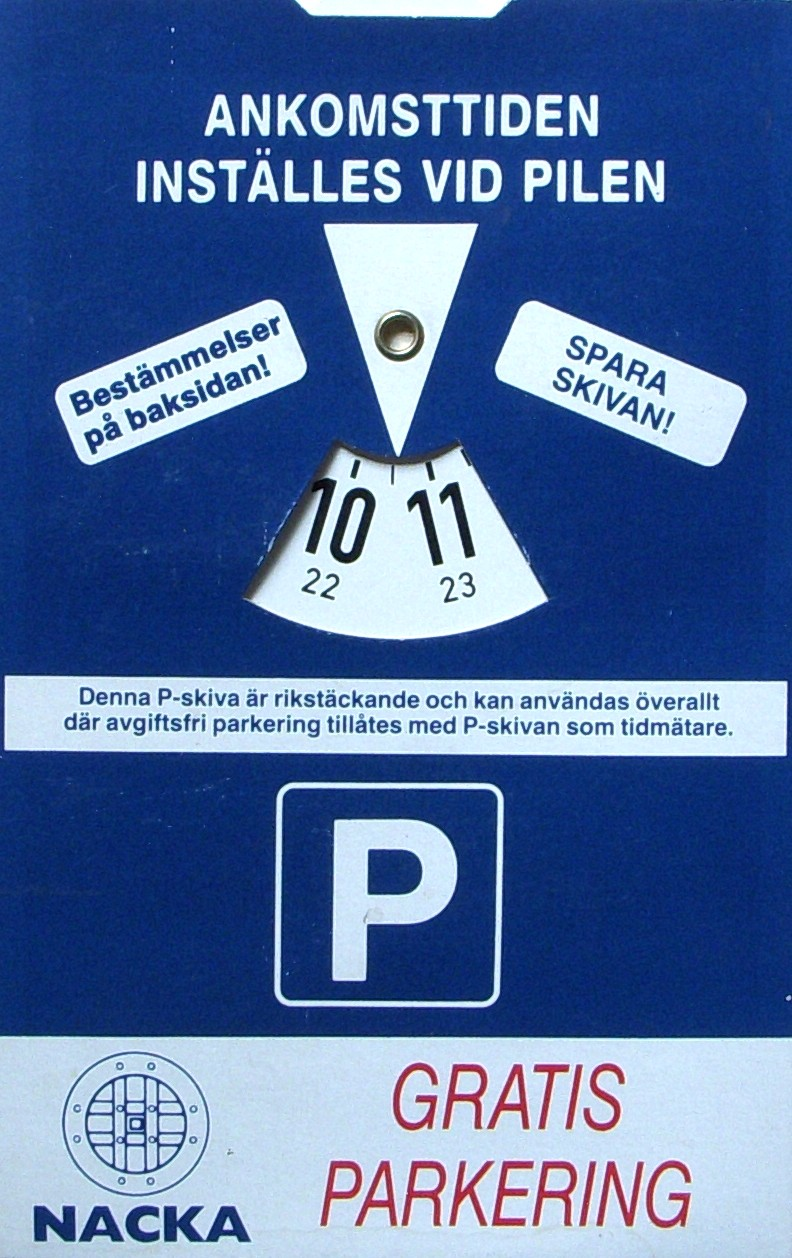
Swedish parking disc

Disc parking was introduced to Sweden when the Farsta Centrum in Stockholm required to use parking discs beginning 1 December 1993.

The regulations on the usage are identical to regulations in Germany.

=== Belgium ===
Most cities in Belgium have a blue zone in the city centre following the French/Swiss model of a 2 hours maximum (signs read "disque obligatoire" or "schijf verplicht"). In Belgium the EU parking disc was introduced to statutory regulations on 31 March 2003. However, Belgian regulation requires the text on the disc to be written in Dutch, French and German. This means discs from other EU countries which mention fewer languages, are not accepted in Belgium

=== The Netherlands ===
There are blue zone parking spaces in many cities in the Netherlands. Most of the city centre in Amsterdam uses a paid parking scheme in daily hours (usually free parking during the night) However, there are some streets next to the central areas which allow for a parking disc, for example 1.5 hours being allowed at Gelderplandsplein in Southern Amsterdam. In Wassenaar the limited time is set to 2 hours.

=== Iceland ===
Parking discs (bifreiðastæðaklukkur) were introduced to Iceland in the town of Akureyri in August 2005 allowing an indicated parking time between 30 minutes and two hours depending on the distance to the city centre. Former parking meters were removed.

=== United Kingdom ===
In the United Kingdom the availability of disc parking varies between local government districts. Where it is offered, parking discs with the branding of the local council are available to the public. In most cases using a parking disc which isn't the one issued in that district is acceptable.

Although some local authorities such as those in Cumbria accept a piece of paper with the arrival time written on it, others such as Pendle do not.

Parking discs are also used in conjunction with a blue badge in certain contexts, where a time limit applies.

UK parking discs are controlled by the BSI publication BS 6571-7:1997.

=== Czechia and Slovakia ===
In Czechoslovakia, a road sign for "Parking with a parking disc" was officially introduced by the federal ordinance no. 100/1975 Sb. effective since 1 January 1976. The only regulation is given as the meaning of the road sign: "When starting a parking, the driver is obliged to visibly place the disc in the vehicle and set the parking start time on it, which he may not change in any way until departure." This regulation remains unchanged in Czechia and Slovakia and their newer legal acts. The permitted parking time can be set at any value by the traffic sign determiner.

The shape, design, size and value resolution of the disc, as well as the method of rounding, were never specified. Alternative marking methods (written time without a disc) are not legal, but may sometimes be tolerated.
