= Alabama Black Belt National Heritage Area =

The location of the National Heritage Area in Alabama

The Alabama Black Belt National Heritage Area is a National Heritage Area encompassing Bibb, Bullock, Butler, Choctaw, Clarke, Conecuh, Dallas, Greene, Hale, Lowndes, Macon, Marengo, Monroe, Montgomery, Perry, Pickens, Sumter, Washington, and Wilcox counties in the Black Belt region of Alabama. The Center for the Study of the Black Belt at the University of West Alabama serves as the local coordinating authority.

The Alabama Black Belt National Heritage Area was designated on January 5, 2023, as part of the National Heritage Area Act of 2022, which created the National Heritage Area System under the National Park Service.

== Landmarks ==
The Alabama Black Belt National Heritage Area includes several natural landmarks. The entirety of Tuskegee National Forest is located in Macon County, while Talladega National Forest overlaps with part of the heritage area in Bibb, Perry, Hale and Dallas counties. Part of the Bartram Trail runs through the Tuskegee National Forest. The Cahaba River National Wildlife Refuge is located primarily in Bibb, while the Choctaw National Wildlife Refuge is primarily located in Bibb, Conecuh, Monroe and Sumter counties. Bladon Springs State Park, Brierfield Ironworks Historical Park, Chickasaw State Park, Paul M. Grist State Park, and Roland Cooper State Park are all located within the heritage area. Several state historic sites managed by the Alabama Historical Commission are also located within the heritage area, including Cahaba (also spelled Cahawba), which was the first permanent state capital of Alabama and was added to the National Register of Historic Places in 1973.

The Alabama Black Belt National Heritage Area includes at least two sites of importance to Native American history in the Moundville Archaeological Site (in Hale County) and the Jere Shine site (in Montgomery County). It also includes several historic landmarks relevant to African-American history in Alabama, including the Tuskegee Institute and Tuskegee Airmen National Historic Sites, as well as Civil Rights-relevant landmarks such as the Selma to Montgomery National Historic Trail (including the Edmund Pettus Bridge), the Dexter Avenue and First Baptist churches and the Brown Chapel A.M.E. Church. In addition, it includes several museums and memorials such as the National Voting Rights Museum, The Legacy Museum, the National Memorial for Peace and Justice, the Freedom Rides Museum, the Rosa Parks Museum, the Freedom Monument Sculpture Park, and the Alabama State University Historic District.
