= Canoe Creek State Park =

State park in Pennsylvania, United States

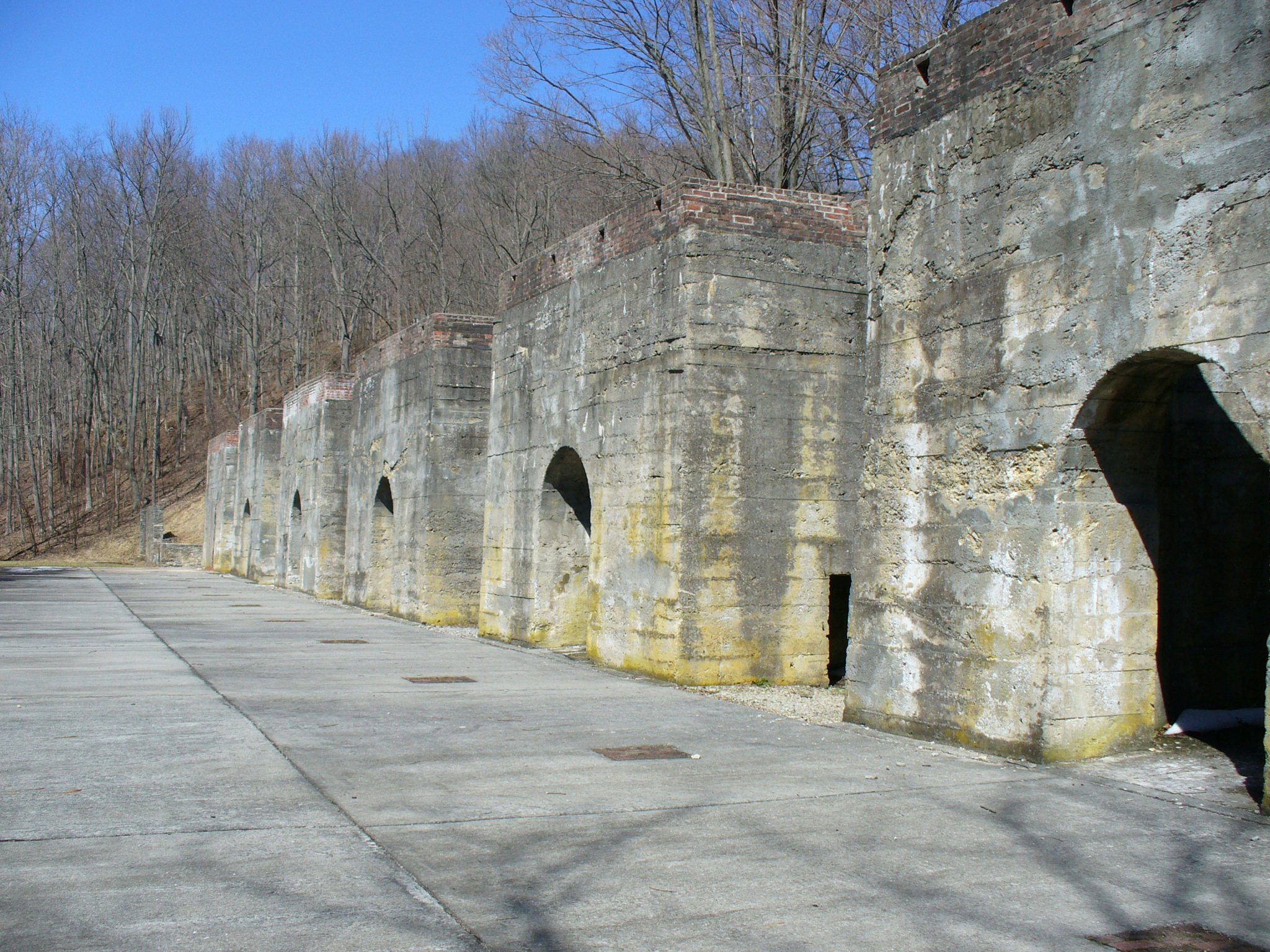
- Abandoned Blair Limestone Company lime kilns

- Location within Pennsylvania Location within the United States
- Interactive map of Canoe Creek State Park
- Location: Frankstown Township, Blair County, Pennsylvania, United States
- Coordinates: 40°28′49″N 78°17′29″W
- Area: 961 acres (389 ha)
- Elevation: 922 ft (281 m)
- Established: 1972
- Administrator: Pennsylvania Department of Conservation and Natural Resources
- Website: Official website
- Pennsylvania State Parks

Canoe Creek State Park is a 961-acre (389 ha) Pennsylvania state park in Frankstown Township in Blair County, Pennsylvania. It is 12 miles east of Altoona, the nearest city. Canoe Lake, at 155 acres (63 ha), is the focus of recreation at the park and is open for fishing year-round. Canoe Creek State Park is a half mile off U.S. Route 22 near the small town of Canoe Creek. The park was opened to the public in 1979 and was developed as part of an expansion effort in the 1970s to improve the state park system in Pennsylvania.

== Industrial history ==
The area in and surrounding Canoe Creek State Park is rich in limestone. The limestone was quarried and used for many purposes like providing needed raw materials for the iron and steel industries of Pennsylvania. There are several abandoned quarries on the park lands. Two limekilns also operated within the boundaries of the park during the 1900s. The remnants of a kiln once owned by the Blair Limestone Company stand today as a reminder of the industrial past. The Blair Limestone Company kiln is a stop on the Path of Progress tour, a driving tour of Pennsylvania's industrial heritage stretching for 500 miles (800 km).

== Wildlife ==
The Frank Felbaum Bat Sanctuary is the home of the largest nursery colony of little brown bats in Pennsylvania. This one-time church, now known as the Canoe Creek Bat Refuge, attracts visitors interested in observing the bats as they emerge each night for feeding. The park is also the site of a hibernaculum for more than 30,000 bats of six species, including the endangered Indiana bat.

Canoe Creek State park is on the path followed by many species of migratory birds including waterfowl, bald eagles and ospreys. The wetlands provide habitat for birds like the bluebird, oriole, red-winged blackbird and the brown thrasher.

The park also provided a habitat for the woodland creatures most common in Pennsylvania, white-tailed deer, turkey, squirrels, chipmunks, and ruffed grouse. The hunting of these animals is permitted during the hunting seasons designated by the Pennsylvania Game Commission.

== Recreation ==
Canoe Lake is stocked with game fish by the Pennsylvania Fish and Boat Commission. Fisherman can catch bass, trout, walleye, muskellunge, pickerel and catfish during the summer and winter months at Canoe Lake. Ice fishing is permitted, but the thickness of the ice is not monitored.

The sand beach at Canoe Lake is opened starting Memorial Day weekend and ending Labor Day weekend. Beginning in 2008 lifeguards will not be posted at the beach.

The only motorized boats permitted on Canoe Lake are electrically powered. They must be properly registered with any state. Non-powered boats such as rowboats, canoes and kayaks must also display registration stickers from any state.

There are eight miles of trails that are open year-round to hiking, cross-country skiing, horseback riding, mountain biking and snowmobiles. These trails follow the shores of Canoe Lake and pass through woodlands, wetlands, meadows and the historic limestone kilns. Hikers are asked to wear fluorescent orange, for safety matters, when hiking during hunting season.

Canoe Creek State Park has a large picnic area near the lake. Charcoal grills are available for use. There are three pavilions for rent. Eight modern cabins are available to rent year-round. Each cabin sleeps six people and has electric heat, two bedrooms, living room, dining room, bathroom, and kitchen. Outside of the cabins are a fire ring and picnic table. The park also has a nine hole disc golf course.

The Terry Wentz Education Center is open year-round, near the modern cabins, and provides brochures on the education program and the wildlife of the park.
