= Omnibus Public Land Management Act of 2009 =

Land management law in the United States

- Long title: An act to designate certain land as components of the National Wilderness Preservation System, to authorize certain programs and activities in the Department of the Interior and the Department of Agriculture, and for other purposes.
- Enacted by: the 111th United States Congress
- Effective: March 30, 2009

Citations
- Public law: Pub. L. 111–11 (text) (PDF)
- Statutes at Large: 123 Stat. 1331 through 123 Stat. 1445 (466 pages)

Codification
- Acts amended: Wild and Scenic Rivers Act, National Trails System Act, Consolidated Natural Resources Act of 2008, and others; see below
- Titles amended: 5, 36, 40

Legislative history
- Introduced in the House of Representatives as H.R. 146 by Rush Holt Jr. (D–NJ) on January 6, 2009; Committee consideration by House Committee on Natural Resources; Passed the House on March 3, 2009 (394-13); Passed the Senate on March 19, 2009 (77–20) with amendment; House agreed to Senate amendment on March 25, 2009 (285-140); Signed into law by President Barack Obama on March 30, 2009

The Omnibus Public Land Management Act of 2009 (Pub. L. 111–11 (text) (PDF), H.R. 146) is a land management law passed in the 111th United States Congress and signed into law by President Barack Obama on March 30, 2009. The bill designates millions of acres in the US as protected and establishes a National Landscape Conservation System. It includes funding for programs, studies and other activities by the Department of the Interior and the Department of Agriculture, and in some cases bars further geothermal leasing, oil and gas leasing, and new mining patents on certain stretches of protected land.

== Legislative history ==
=== 110th Congress ===
On June 26, 2008, Senator Jeff Bingaman of New Mexico introduced the Omnibus Public Land Management Act of 2008 (S. 3213). Although the bill had some support from both Democrats and Republicans, including Senate Majority Leader Harry Reid of Nevada, the Senate never voted on the measure due to threats by Senator Tom Coburn (R-Oklahoma) to filibuster the bill.

=== 111th Congress ===
==== S. 22 ====
On January 7, 2009, Bingaman introduced the Omnibus Public Land Management Act of 2009 (S. 22), a new bill which incorporated 159 bills that had been considered by the Senate Committee on Energy and Natural Resources during the 110th Congress and, in some cases, earlier Congresses. Despite vehement opposition from Coburn and some other Republicans, the Senate passed a cloture motion on January 11 by a vote of 66–12 and then passed the bill on January 15 by a vote of 73–21, with four members not voting.

The bill was then sent to the House of Representatives, where it was expected to pass by a wide margin. The bill was held at the desk instead of being sent to a committee.

On March 11, 2009, the House considered the bill under suspension of the rules, meaning that a two-thirds vote would be required for passage. Those voting in favor of the bill (predominantly Democrats) fell two votes short of a two-thirds majority, 282-144. 34 Republicans voted in favor of the bill, while three Democrats voted against it: Dan Boren of Oklahoma, Jim Marshall of Georgia, and Collin Peterson of Minnesota. House Democrats could then have brought the bill back to the floor under regular procedure, which would have allowed Republicans to submit amendments to the bill.

The bill, as voted on by the House, had been amended by Jason Altmire (D-Pennsylvania), to prohibit the closing of the lands described in the bill to hunting and fishing, presumably to persuade sportsmen and hunters to vote for the bill.

==== H.R. 146 ====
On March 3, 2009, the House of Representatives passed a bill under suspension of the rules, the Revolutionary War and War of 1812 Battlefield Protection Act (H.R. 146), 394-13. On March 12, one day after the House failed to pass the Omnibus Public Land Management Act, Reid announced that he would file cloture on H.R. 146. While in the Senate, the bill was amended to include a majority of the text in S. 22. The Senate voted 73–21 for cloture and 77-20 to pass the bill. The House agreed to the Senate amendments, 285-140, on March 25.

President Barack Obama signed the bill into law on March 30, 2009, declaring one provision unconstitutional in his signing statement.

== Components ==
=== Title I ===
Title I of the bill designates two million acres (8,000 km²) of wilderness in nine states (California, Colorado, Idaho, Michigan, New Mexico, Oregon, Utah, Virginia, and West Virginia) for protection through addition to the National Wilderness Preservation System. Among these lands are:

- 37,000 acres (150 km^{2}) in the Monongahela National Forest.
- 43,000 acres (174 km^{2}) in the Jefferson National Forest.
- wilderness additions in the vicinity of Mount Hood, Oregon, including additions to the Badger Creek Wilderness, Bull of the Woods Wilderness, Mark O. Hatfield Wilderness, Mount Hood Wilderness, and Salmon-Huckleberry Wilderness, as well as designation of the Clackamas Wilderness, Roaring River Wilderness, and Lower White River Wilderness.
- 31,000 acres (125 km^{2}) in the Oregon Badlands. (see Oregon Badlands Wilderness and Spring Basin Wilderness)
- 23,000 acres (93 km^{2}) in Oregon's Cascade–Siskiyou National Monument. (see Soda Mountain Wilderness)
- 13,700 acres (55 km^{2}) in the Siskiyou National Forest. (see Copper Salmon Wilderness)
- 250,000 acres (1,010 km^{2}) in and near Zion National Park.
- 698 acres (2.82 km^{2}) near Otter Creek Wilderness in West Virginia
- 15,000 acres (61 km^{2}) in San Miguel County, New Mexico. (see Sabinoso Wilderness)
- 11,739 acres (47.51 km^{2}) in Pictured Rocks National Lakeshore. (see Beaver Basin Wilderness)
- 517,000 acres (2,092 km^{2}) in Idaho's Owyhee Canyonlands:
  - Big Jacks Creek Wilderness – 52,826 acres (214 km^{2})
  - Bruneau – Jarbidge Rivers Wilderness – 89,996 acres (364.20 km^{2})
  - Little Jacks Creek Wilderness – 50,929 acres (206 km^{2})
  - North Fork Owyhee Wilderness – 43,413 acres (176 km^{2})
  - Owyhee River Wilderness – 267,328 acres (1,082 km^{2})
  - Pole Creek Wilderness – 12,533 acres (51 km^{2})
- 710,000 acres (2,870 km^{2}) in California, including:
  - 79,820 acres (323.0 km^{2}) added to the Hoover Wilderness in the Humboldt-Toiyabe and Inyo National Forests.
  - 14,721 acres (59.57 km^{2}) in the Inyo National Forest. (see Owens River Headwaters Wilderness)
  - 70,411 acres (284.94 km^{2}) added to the John Muir Wilderness in the Inyo National Forest and Bureau of Land Management lands.
  - 528 acres (2.14 km^{2}) added to the Ansel Adams Wilderness in the Inyo National Forest.
  - 229,993 acres (930.75 km^{2}) in the Inyo National Forest and Bureau of Land Management lands. (see White Mountains Wilderness)
  - 34,342 acres (138.98 km^{2}) in the Inyo National Forest and Bureau of Land Management lands. (see Granite Mountain Wilderness) [This reference leads to the Granite Mtn in Yavapai Co. AZ, the CA location is found just East of Mono Lake, between Mono Lake and the Nevada State Line (https://www.blm.gov/visit/granite-mountain)]
  - 12,282 acres (49.70 km^{2}) in the Angeles National Forest. (see Magic Mountain Wilderness)
  - 26,757 acres (108.28 km^{2}) in the Angeles National Forest. (see Pleasant View Ridge Wilderness)
  - 2,053 acres (8.31 km^{2}) added to the Agua Tibia Wilderness in the Cleveland National Forest.
  - 5,585 acres (22.60 km^{2}) in the San Bernardino National Forest. (see Cahuilla Mountain Wilderness)
  - 20,217 acres (81.82 km^{2}) in the San Bernardino National Forest. (see South Fork San Jacinto Wilderness)
  - 2,149 acres (8.70 km^{2}) added to the Santa Rosa Wilderness in the San Bernardino National Forest and Bureau of Land Management lands.
  - 15,621 acres (63.22 km^{2}) of Bureau of Land Management lands. (see Beauty Mountain Wilderness)
  - 36,700 acres (149 km^{2}) in Joshua Tree National Park, with another 43,300 acres (175 km^{2}) pending cessation of non-wilderness activities and acquisition of inholdings.
  - 4,635 acres (18.76 km^{2}) added to the Orocopia Mountains Wilderness in Bureau of Land Management lands.
  - 22,645 acres (91.64 km^{2}) added to the Palen-McCoy Wilderness in Bureau of Land Management lands.
  - 24,404 acres (98.76 km^{2}) of Bureau of Land Management lands. (see Pinto Mountains Wilderness)
  - 12,815 acres (51.86 km^{2}) added to the Chuckwalla Mountains Wilderness in Bureau of Land Management lands.

=== Title II ===
Title II establishes a National Landscape Conservation System, to include Bureau of Land Management-administered National Monuments, National Conservation Areas, Wilderness Study Areas, components of the National Trails System, components of the National Wild and Scenic Rivers System, and components of the National Wilderness Preservation System.

Title II also designates four new National Conservation Areas (Fort Stanton – Snowy River Cave National Conservation Area, Snake River Birds of Prey National Conservation Area, Red Cliffs National Conservation Area in Washington County, Utah, and Dominguez-Escalante National Conservation Area) and one new National Monument (the Prehistoric Trackways National Monument in the Robledo Mountains of New Mexico). It also transfers lands in Nevada, Utah, Idaho, and Washington to federal control.

=== Title III ===
Title III authorizes the United States Secretary of Agriculture to, through the Chief of the United States Forest Service, conduct studies in the interest of preserving open space in southern Colorado and deliver "an annual report on the wildland firefighter safety practices...including training programs and activities for wildland fire suppression, prescribed burning, and wildland fire use, during the preceding calendar year." Title III also prohibits further oil and gas leasing, geothermal leasing, and mining patents in a stretch of the Bridger-Teton National Forest; this provision was based on a bill being crafted by Senator Craig L. Thomas of Wyoming before his death.

=== Title IV ===
Title IV authorizes the Chief of the Forest Service to solicit (from regional foresters) nominations of forest landscapes of at least 50,000 acres (200 km^{2}), primarily consisting of national forest lands, which are in need of "active ecosystem restoration," for the carrying out of ecological restoration treatments. The Chief, acting on behalf of the Secretary of Agriculture, then may select up to ten of these proposals, aided by a fifteen-member advisory board, to be funded in any given fiscal year. For each proposal selected, 50% of the expenditures of the execution and monitoring of ecological restoration treatments would be paid for by a Collaborative Forest Landscape Restoration Fund in the United States Treasury. However, each proposal's expenditures are limited to $4 million per year.

=== Title V ===
Title V designates thousands of miles of new additions to the National Wild and Scenic Rivers System. It also adds six trails to the National Trails System: the Arizona National Scenic Trail, the New England National Scenic Trail, the Ice Age Floods National Geologic Trail, the Washington–Rochambeau Revolutionary Route National Historic Trail, the Pacific Northwest National Scenic Trail and the Trail of Tears National Historic Trail.

=== Title VI ===
Title VI creates a number of new United States Department of the Interior programs. One of these programs, the Wolf Livestock Loss Demonstration Project, gives states and Indian tribes federal grants to help livestock producers to reduce livestock loss due to predation by wolves in non-lethal ways, as well as for the purpose of compensating livestock producers for their loss of livestock due to predation by wolves.

Another part of Title VI, the Paleontological Resources Preservation Act, was originally a Senate bill introduced in 2007 by Daniel Akaka (D-Hawaii). This provision establishes stronger penalties than previously required for nonpermitted removal of scientifically significant fossils from federal lands. The provision was endorsed and strongly supported by the Society of Vertebrate Paleontology, an international association of professional and amateur vertebrate paleontologists. In contrast, the Association of Applied Paleontological Sciences, an association of commercial fossil dealers, opposed the measure.

=== Title VII ===
Title VII makes three additions to the National Park System and expands current National Park designations. It also authorizes an American Battlefield Protection Program, a Preserve America program, a Save America's Treasures Program, and a Route 66 Corridor Preservation Program, all to be carried out by the National Park Service. New National Park System components would include:

- Paterson Great Falls National Historical Park in Paterson, New Jersey
- President William Jefferson Clinton Birthplace Home National Historic Site in Hope, Arkansas
- River Raisin National Battlefield Park in Frenchtown, Michigan

=== Title VIII ===
Title VIII designates ten new National Heritage Areas at the cost of $103.5 million:

- Sec. 8001. Sangre de Cristo National Heritage Area, Colorado.
- Sec. 8002. Cache La Poudre River Corridor National Heritage Area, Colorado.
- Sec. 8003. South Park National Heritage Area, Colorado.
- Sec. 8004. Northern Plains National Heritage Area, North Dakota.
- Sec. 8005. Baltimore National Heritage Area, Maryland.
- Sec. 8006. Freedom's Way National Heritage Area, Massachusetts and New Hampshire.
- Sec. 8007. Mississippi Hills National Heritage Area.
- Sec. 8008. Mississippi Delta National Heritage Area.
- Sec. 8009. Muscle Shoals National Heritage Area, Alabama.
- Sec. 8010. Kenai Mountains - Turnagain Arm National Heritage Area, Alaska.

=== Title IX ===
Title IX authorizes three new studies to examine new reclamation projects under the jurisdiction of the Bureau of Reclamation. It also creates 15 new water and endangered fish projects in four states. Furthermore, Title IX puts some federal water reclamation facilities under local control and funds conservation efforts.

=== Title X ===
Title X codifies the settlements of three water disputes in California, Nevada, and New Mexico, in an effort to resolve decades of litigation.

=== Title XI ===
Title XI reauthorizes the National Geologic Mapping Act of 1992 at a cost of $64 million per year through the year 2018. It furthermore authorizes groundwater surveys in New Mexico, also by the U.S. Geological Survey.

=== Title XII ===
Title XII creates five new oceanic observation, research, and exploration programs at a cost of $2.6 billion, including programs for undersea research, undersea and coastal mapping, acidification research, and ocean conservation. One provision, the Integrated Coastal and Ocean Observation System Act, would "establish a national integrated System of ocean, coastal, and Great Lakes observing systems, comprised of Federal and non-Federal components coordinated at the national level by the National Ocean Research Leadership Council" in order to "support national defense, marine commerce, navigation safety, weather, climate, and marine forecasting, energy siting and production, economic development, ecosystem-based marine, coastal, and Great Lakes resource management, public safety, and public outreach training and education."

=== Title XIII ===
Title XIII deals with miscellaneous bills, including one that funds the National Tropical Botanical Garden in Hawaii and another that increases the number of Assistant Energy Secretaries in the United States Department of Energy to eight. Title XIII also amends the Fisheries Restoration and Irrigation Mitigation Act of 2000 and the Alaska Natural Gas Pipeline Act.

=== Title XIV ===
Title XIV, the Christopher and Dana Reeve Paralysis Act, provides $105 million over five years for coordinated paralysis research by the National Institutes of Health.

=== Title XV ===
Title XV grants the Smithsonian Institution $69 million for laboratory and greenhouse construction at three Smithsonian facilities.

== Acts amended ==
The Omnibus Public Land Management Act of 2009 amended the following acts of Congress, in order of first appearance:

- Public Law 100-326
- Virginia Wilderness Act of 1984
- Wild and Scenic Rivers Act
- Columbia River Gorge National Scenic Area Act
- Oregon Wilderness Act
- Santa Rosa and San Jacinto Mountains National Monument Act of 2000
- Indian Peaks Wilderness Area, the Arapaho National Recreation Area and the Oregon Islands Wilderness Area Act
- Public Law 103-64
- Omnibus Parks and Public Lands Management Act of 1996
- Southern Nevada Public Land Management Act of 1998
- Public Law 108-67
- Department of the Interior and Related Agencies Appropriations Act, 1999
- T'uf Shur Bien Preservation Trust Area Act
- National Trails System Act
- Alaska National Interest Lands Conservation Act
- Public Law 102-543
- Weir Farm National Historic Site Establishment Act of 1990
- Little River Canyon National Preserve Act of 1992
- An Act to rename and expand the boundaries of the Mound City Group National Monument in Ohio
- National Parks and Recreation Act of 1978
- Public Law 96-607
- Palo Alto Battlefield National Historic Site Act of 1991
- Consolidated Appropriations Act, 2005
- National Defense Authorization Act for Fiscal Year 2002
- Public Law 97-250
- Petrified Forest National Park Expansion Act of 2004
- Delaware National Coastal Special Resources Study Act
- Federal Lands Recreation Enhancement Act
- Crossroads of the American Revolution National Heritage Area Act of 2006
- Consolidated Natural Resources Act of 2008
- Department of the Interior and Related Agencies Appropriations Act, 1996
- Dayton Aviation Heritage Preservation Act of 1992
- Public Law 87-213
- Public Law 106-45
- National Cave and Karst Research Institute Act of 1998
- Public Law 87-126
- Quinebaug and Shetucket Rivers Valley National Heritage Corridor Act of 1994
- Delaware and Lehigh National Heritage Corridor Act of 1988
- Erie Canalway National Heritage Corridor Act
- Public Law 99-647
- Reclamation Wastewater and Groundwater Study and Facilities Act
- Public Law 106-392
- Reclamation Projects Authorization and Adjustment Act of 1992
- Public Law 87-590
- Colorado River Storage Project Act
- Public Law 87-483
- National Geologic Mapping Act of 1992
- Coastal Zone Management Act of 1972
- Act of February 22, 1889
- Morrill Act of 1862
- Fisheries Restoration and Irrigation Mitigation Act of 2000
- Alaska Natural Gas Pipeline Act
- Department of Energy Organization Act
