= Black Belt (region of Alabama) =

Region of Alabama originally named for black topsoil

Coordinates: 32°36′41.82″N 87°34′39.05″W

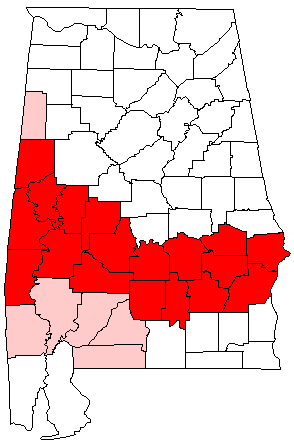
Map of Alabama's Black Belt region. Counties highlighted in red are historically considered part of the Black Belt region. Counties highlighted in pink are sometimes considered part of the region.

The Black Belt is a region of the U.S. state of Alabama. The term originally referred to the region's rich, black soil, much of it in the soil order Vertisols. The term took on an additional meaning in the 19th century, when the region was developed for cotton plantation agriculture, in which the workers were enslaved African Americans. After the American Civil War, many freedmen stayed in the area as sharecroppers and tenant farmers, continuing to comprise a majority of the population in many of these counties.

The physical geography of the "Black Belt" refers to a much larger region of the Southern United States, stretching from Delaware to Texas but centered on uplands areas of Georgia, Alabama, Mississippi, and Louisiana.

In the Antebellum and Jim Crow eras, the white elite of the Black Belt dominated Alabama state politics well into the 1960s, a trend that has continued to the current day. As in other Southern states, the white-dominated state legislature of Alabama passed laws and a constitution that created barriers to voter registration, essentially disenfranchising most black people and many poor whites.

In addition, the state legislature did not redistrict congressional or state legislative districts after 1901 until it did so in the 1960s under US Supreme Court order. The white rural elite continued to dominate the state despite the rise of urbanized, industrial cities such as Birmingham. Montgomery, the Black Belt's largest city, has been the capital of Alabama since 1846. Montgomery, Selma and other parts of the Black Belt were important centers of African-American public activism during the civil rights movement from c.1954 to 1968.

Since the black population gained the renewed ability to exercise the franchise under the Voting Rights Act of 1965, they have largely supported Democratic Party candidates. This is in contrast to the majority-white areas of the state, where since the late 20th century, conservatives have largely shifted from the Democratic to the Republican Party.

The Alabama Black Belt National Heritage Area was established in the National Heritage Area Act in 2022, signed into law by President Joe Biden on January 6, 2023. The National Heritage Area will help preserve historic sites of Black history, the Civil Rights movement, and promote tourism across 19 counties.

== Geology ==
The region is underlain by a thin layer of rich, black soil developed atop the chalk of the Selma Group, a geologic unit dating to the Cretaceous.

== History ==
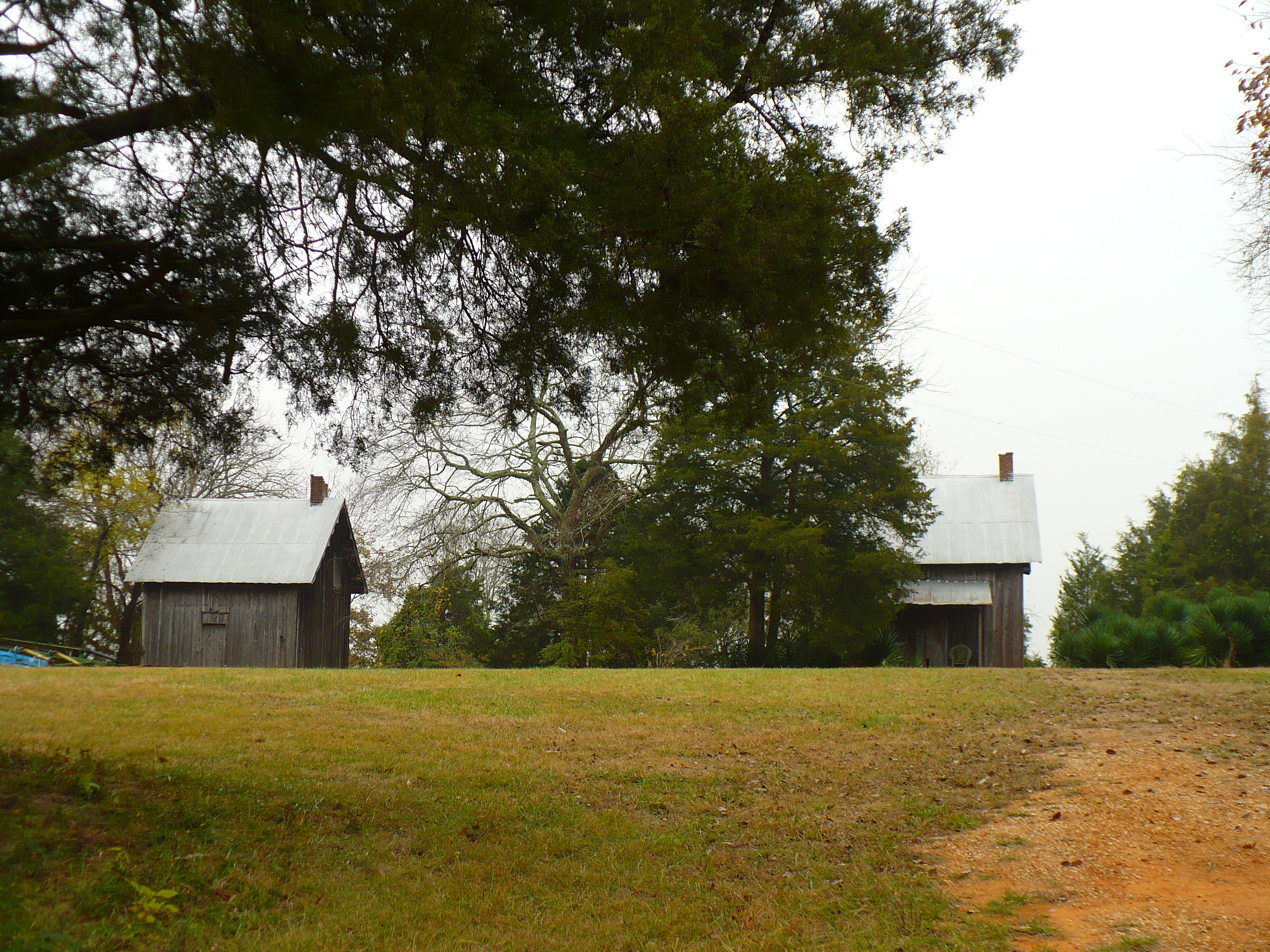
Former slave cabins at Faunsdale Plantation in Marengo County.

Lacking a reliable source of water, the earliest settlers avoided farming the black soil in the belt until the discovery that deep artesian wells could be drilled to supply water for people, livestock, and crops. Beginning in the 1830s after Indian Removal, cotton plantations were developed that produced the commodity crop that became Alabama's greatest source of wealth. Before the American Civil War, these plantations were worked by thousands of African-American slaves. The Black Belt region had the highest density of population in the state and was majority-black.

The white planters and their elected representatives of the Black Belt established political power in the state legislature in the cotton era; the white rural elite retained their dominance long after the state began to develop more urbanized areas and an industrial economy. The state legislature did not redistrict to reflect population changes and the rise of urban areas from 1901 to 1972, when it was ordered by a federal court, following important apportionment cases such as Baker v. Carr (1964). Birmingham, the largest and most industrialized city in the state, was among those whose residents, both black and white, had been underrepresented for decades in the state legislature.

The Black Belt's largest city, Montgomery, was designated as the capital of Alabama in 1846. Because Alabama was geographically central to the slave states, Montgomery was also designated as the original capital of the Confederate States of America. The region's distance from the front lines during the American Civil War saved it from much of the ravages of war. Many of the Greek Revival mansions of the 19th-century planters have survived, as have some of the plantations' slave quarters. Gaineswood in Demopolis and Magnolia Grove in Greensboro, Alabama, are among those that can be visited by tourists today.

Many descendants of freed slaves continued to work as sharecroppers and laborers after emancipation, but many migrated among the counties, moved to cities, or left the state for other opportunities. Around 1910–20, the infestation of the cotton crop by the boll weevil destroyed much of the crops and plantation system, but the lingering effects of a cotton economy remain evident. To escape lynchings and social oppression, and after the boll weevil and increased mechanization of agriculture, thousands of African Americans left Alabama to go to industrial cities of the North and Midwest in the Great Migration of the first half of the 20th century. But African Americans continue to make up the majority of the population in most rural Black Belt counties. Today the term "Black Belt" is mostly used by scholars and the media as a geologic characterization.

Some of the most important events of the Civil Rights Movement occurred in the Black Belt of Alabama. These included Rosa Parks' refusal to give up her bus seat, which led to the Montgomery bus boycott; the Selma to Montgomery marches of 1965 and voter registration reform drives, focusing in Selma, to enable African Americans to vote (see Voting Rights Act). They had been essentially disenfranchised after conservative white Democrats regained political power in the state in the late 19th century. White Americans made voter registration and voting so difficult that most black and many poor white Americans were excluded from the political system for decades.

Today, Alabama's rural Black Belt includes some of the poorest counties in the United States. Along with high rates of poverty, the area is typified by declining populations, a primarily agricultural landscape with low-density settlement, high unemployment, poor access to education and medical care, substandard housing and high rates of crime.

== Counties ==
The list of counties comprising the Black Belt is often dependent on the context but historically includes 18 counties:

- Barbour
- Bullock
- Butler
- Choctaw
- Crenshaw
- Dallas
- Greene
- Hale
- Lowndes
- Macon
- Marengo
- Montgomery
- Perry
- Pickens
- Pike
- Russell
- Sumter
- Wilcox

Clarke, Conecuh, Escambia, Monroe, and Washington counties are sometimes included in the region, but are usually considered part of Alabama's southern coastal plain. Lamar does not meet the soil traits but is often included due to its rural character.

== Demographics ==
46 of Alabama's 80 majority-African American municipalities (57.5%) are located within the Black Belt

As of the 2000 census, Alabama's 18-county Black Belt region had a population of 589,041 (13.25% of the state's total population). There were 226,191 households and 153,357 families residing within the region.

The racial makeup of the Black Belt region was 52.24% African American (307,734 people), 45.87% White (270,175 people), 0.25% Native American (1,472 people), 0.52% Asian (3,067 people), 0.03% Pacific Islander (153 people), 0.31% from other races (1,850 people), and 0.78% from two or more races (4,590 people). Hispanics or Latinos of any race were 1.09% of the population (6,404 people).

The median income for a household in the Black Belt region was $27,130, and the median income for a family was $35,698. Males had a median income of $32,226 versus $22,021 for females. The per capita income for the region was $15,633.

A July 1, 2007 U.S. Census Bureau estimate placed the region's population at 575,783, a decline of 2.25% since 2000.

== Politics ==
Alabama 2024 presidential election by county, Donald Trump in red, Kamala Harris in blue.

In electoral maps of the 20th and early 21st centuries, the Black Belt has appeared as a "Blue Belt" because of the voters' strong support for the Democratic Party. With the exception of parts of the city of Birmingham, the outline of Alabama's 7th congressional district roughly matches the western Black Belt region. Terri Sewell (D) currently represents that district in the United States House of Representatives.

== See also ==
- History of Alabama
