= Tennessee Civil War National Heritage Area =

United States National Heritage Area in Tennessee

Tennessee Civil War National Heritage Area is a federally designated National Heritage Area that encompasses the entire U.S. state of Tennessee. The heritage area concentrates on eight major corridors: the Mississippi River, Cumberland River, Tennessee River, Louisville and Nashville Railroad, Nashville and Chattanooga Railroad, East Tennessee Georgia and Virginia Railroad, Memphis and Charleston Railroad and the Nashville and Northwestern Railroad corridors.

The Tennessee Civil War National Heritage Area was designated in 1996. It is managed by the Middle Tennessee State University Center for Historic Preservation.
