= National Heritage Area =

Land designation by the U.S. government to encourage preservation

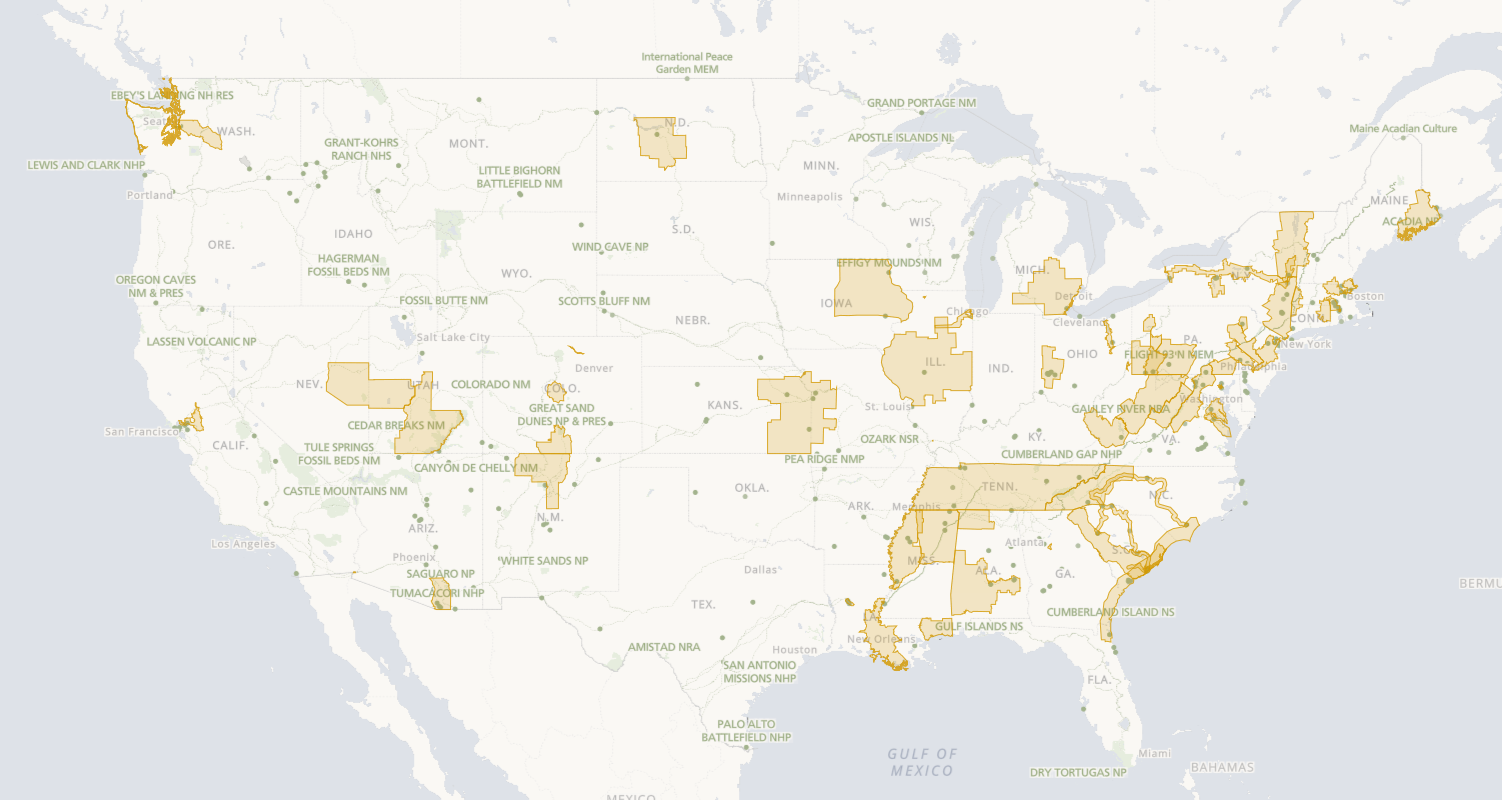
Map of the National Heritage Areas in the continental United States

In the United States, a National Heritage Area (NHA) is a site designated by Act of Congress, intended to encourage historic preservation of the area and an appreciation of the history and heritage of the site. There are currently 62 NHAs, some of which use variations of the title, such as National Heritage Corridor.

National Heritage Areas are neither National Park Service units or federally owned or managed land. NHAs are usually administered by state governments, non-profit organizations or other private corporations, referred to as "local coordinating entities". A single coordinating authority oversees each area. The National Park Service provides an advisory role and limited technical, planning and financial assistance, in a form of Public–private partnership.

Each area has its own authorizing legislation and a set of unique resources and goals. Areas considered for designation must have specific elements. First, the landscape must be a nationally unique natural, cultural, historic, or scenic resource. Second, when the related sites are linked, they must tell a unique story about the U.S. NHAs may often geographically overlap each other, and may also overlap portions or entireties of federally owned or managed land, National Park Service units and other protected areas. To date, more total NHAs, as well as more total acreage of land, have been designated east of the Mississippi River.

== Legislative history ==
The first NHA created, the Illinois and Michigan Canal National Heritage Corridor, located in Illinois, was signed into law by President Ronald Reagan on August 21, 1984.

The National Heritage Areas Act of 2006 designated ten new NHAs and authorized three studies of potential NHAs. It was signed into law by President George W. Bush on October 12, 2006.

The Omnibus Public Land Management Act of 2009 designated ten new NHAs. The bill was signed into law by President Barack Obama on March 30, 2009.

The John D. Dingell Jr. Conservation, Management, and Recreation Act of 2019 laid out procedures for planning and management of NHAs and designated six new NHAs. It was signed into law by President Donald Trump on March 12, 2019.

The National Heritage Area Act of 2022 established a National Heritage Area System and created a standardized process for the Department of the Interior to provide financial and technical assistance to NHAs. The law also provides a process for the study and designation of new NHAs and evaluation for existing NHAs. It authorized three studies of potential NHAs and established seven new NHAs. The bill was passed by the Senate on December 20, 2022 by unanimous consent and the House on December 22 (on a vote of 326-95), and was signed into law by President Joe Biden on January 5, 2023.

== List of National Heritage Areas ==
=== Current ===
There are 62 National Heritage Areas, listed below with their respective local coordinating entity:

Area	State(s)	Designation Date	Local Coordinating Authority	Notes
Abraham Lincoln National Heritage Area	Illinois	May 8, 2008	Looking for Lincoln Heritage Coalition	
Alabama Black Belt National Heritage Area	Alabama	January 5, 2023	Center for the Study of the Black Belt at the University of West Alabama	
Appalachian Forest National Heritage Area	Maryland/West Virginia	March 12, 2019	Appalachian Forest Heritage Area, Inc.	
Arabia Mountain National Heritage Area	Georgia	October 12, 2006	Arabia Mountain Heritage Area Alliance	
Atchafalaya National Heritage Area	Louisiana	October 12, 2006	Louisiana Office of Tourism, Louisiana Department of Culture, Recreation and Tourism	
Augusta Canal National Heritage Area	Georgia	1996	Augusta Canal Authority	
Baltimore National Heritage Area	Maryland	March 30, 2009	City of Baltimore	
Blue Ridge National Heritage Area	North Carolina	November 10, 2003	Blue Ridge National Heritage Area Partnership	
Bronzeville–Black Metropolis National Heritage Area	Illinois	January 5, 2023	Black Metropolis National Heritage Area Commission	
Cache La Poudre River Corridor National Heritage Area	Colorado	March 30, 2009	Poudre Heritage Alliance	
Cane River National Heritage Area	Louisiana	1994	Cane River National Heritage Area Commission	
Champlain Valley National Heritage Area	New York/Vermont	October 12, 2006	Champlain Valley National Heritage Partnership	
Crossroads of the American Revolution National Heritage Area	New Jersey	2006	Crossroads of the American Revolution Association	
Delaware and Lehigh National Heritage Corridor	Pennsylvania	1988	Delaware and Lehigh National Heritage Corridor, Inc.	
Downeast Maine National Heritage Area	Maine	January 5, 2023	Sunrise County Economic Council	
Erie Canalway National Heritage Corridor	New York	2000	Erie Canalway National Heritage Corridor	
Essex National Heritage Area	Massachusetts	1996	Essex National Heritage Commission	
Freedom's Frontier National Heritage Area	Kansas/Missouri	October 12, 2006	Partnership Team	
Freedom's Way National Heritage Area	Massachusetts/New Hampshire	March 30, 2009		
Great Basin National Heritage Area	Nevada/Utah	October 12, 2006	Great Basin Heritage Area Partnership	
Gullah-Geechee Cultural Heritage Corridor	Florida/Georgia/North Carolina/South Carolina	October 12, 2006	Gullah Geechee Cultural Heritage Corridor Commission	
Hudson River Valley National Heritage Area	New York	1996	Hudson River Valley Greenway	
Illinois & Michigan Canal National Heritage Corridor	Illinois	August 21, 1984	Canal Corridor Association	
John H. Chafee Blackstone River Valley National Heritage Corridor	Massachusetts/Rhode Island	November 10, 1986	Blackstone River Valley Heritage Corridor Commission	
Journey Through Hallowed Ground National Heritage Area	Maryland/Pennsylvania/Virginia/West Virginia	May 8, 2008	The Journey Through Hallowed Ground Partnership	
Kenai Mountains – Turnagain Arm National Heritage Area	Alaska	March 30, 2009		
Lackawanna Heritage Valley National and State Heritage Area	Pennsylvania	2000	Lackawanna Heritage Valley Authority	
Last Green Valley National Heritage Corridor	Connecticut/Massachusetts	November 2, 1994	The Last Green Valley	Formerly the Quinebaug and Shetucket Rivers Valley National Heritage Corridor. Renamed December 19, 2014.
Maritime Washington National Heritage Area	Washington	March 12, 2019	Washington Trust for Historic Preservation	
Mississippi Delta National Heritage Area	Mississippi	March 30, 2009	Delta Council	
Mississippi Gulf Coast National Heritage Area	Mississippi	December 8, 2004	Office of Coastal Management and Planning, Mississippi Department of Marine Resources	
Mississippi Hills National Heritage Area	Mississippi	March 30, 2009	Mississippi Hills Heritage Area Alliance	
Mormon Pioneer National Heritage Area	Utah	October 12, 2006	Utah Heritage Highway 89 Alliance	
MotorCities National Heritage Area	Michigan	November 6, 1998		Initially named Automobile National Heritage Area
Mountains to Sound Greenway	Washington	March 12, 2019	Mountains to Sound Greenway Trust	
Muscle Shoals National Heritage Area	Alabama	March 30, 2009	University of North Alabama	
National Aviation Heritage Area	Ohio	2004	Aviation Heritage Foundation, Inc.	
National Coal Heritage Area	West Virginia	November 12, 1996	National Coal Heritage Area Authority	
Niagara Falls National Heritage Area	New York	November 2008		
Northern Neck National Heritage Area	Virginia	January 5, 2023	Sunrise County Economic Council	
Northern Plains National Heritage Area	North Dakota	March 30, 2009		
Northern Rio Grande National Heritage Area	New Mexico	October 12, 2006		
Ohio & Erie Canalway National Heritage Area	Ohio	1996	Ohio & Erie Canalway Coalition	
Oil Region National Heritage Area	Pennsylvania	2004	Oil Region Alliance of Business, Industry & Tourism	
Path of Progress National Heritage Tour Route	Pennsylvania	November 1988	Southwestern Pennsylvania Heritage Preservation Commission	Decommissioned in 2008
Rivers of Steel National Heritage Area	Pennsylvania	1996	Steel Industry Heritage Corporation	
Sacramento-San Joaquin Delta National Heritage Area	California	March 12, 2019	Delta Protection Commission	
Sangre de Cristo National Heritage Area	Colorado	March 30, 2009	Sangre de Cristo NHA Steering Committee	
Santa Cruz Valley National Heritage Area	Arizona	March 12, 2019	Santa Cruz Valley Heritage Alliance, Inc.	
Schuylkill River National and State Heritage Area	Pennsylvania	2000		
Shenandoah Valley Battlefields National Historic District	Virginia	1996	Shenandoah Valley Battlefields Foundation	
Silos & Smokestacks National Heritage Area	Iowa	1996		
South Carolina National Heritage Corridor	South Carolina	1996	South Carolina National Heritage Corridor, Inc.	
South Park National Heritage Area	Colorado	March 30, 2009	Tourism and Community Development Office, Park County	
Southern Campaign of the Revolution National Heritage Corridor	North Carolina/South Carolina	January 5, 2023	University of South Carolina	
Southern Maryland National Heritage Area	Maryland	January 5, 2023	Tri-County Council for Southern Maryland	
St. Croix National Heritage Area	U.S. Virgin Islands	January 5, 2023	Virgin Islands State Historic Preservation Office	
Susquehanna National Heritage Area	Pennsylvania	March 12, 2019	Susquehanna Heritage Corporation	
Tennessee Civil War National Heritage Area	Tennessee	1996	Center for Historic Preservation, Middle Tennessee State University	
Upper Housatonic Valley National Heritage Area	Connecticut/Massachusetts	October 12, 2006	Upper Housatonic Valley National Heritage Area, Inc.	
Wheeling National Heritage Area	West Virginia	October 11, 2000	Wheeling National Heritage Area Corporation	
Yuma Crossing National Heritage Area	Arizona/California	October 19, 2000	Yuma Crossing National Heritage Area Corporation	

=== Proposed ===
Area	State(s)	Passed by Congress	Ref.
Great Dismal Swamp National Heritage Area	Virginia	Study approved, in process	
Ka‘ena Point National Heritage Area	Hawaii	Study approved, in process	
Monterey Bay National Heritage Area	California	No	
Guam National Heritage Area	Guam	Study approved, in process	
Coastal Virginia National Heritage Area	Virginia	No	
South Kona National Heritage Area	Hawaii	No	
Nation's Oldest Port National Heritage Area	Florida	No	
Calumet National Heritage Area	Indiana, Illinois	Study approved, in process	
Lahaina National Heritage Area	Hawaii	Study approved, in process	
Kentucky Wildlands National Heritage Area	Kentucky	Study approved 2019, study completed 2023, criteria met	
Connecticut Western Reserve	Ohio	Study completed 2011, criteria not met	
Chattahoochee Trade National Heritage Area	Georgia, Alabama	Study completed 2015, criteria not met	
Kentucky Lincoln National Heritage Area	Kentucky	Study completed 2015, criteria not met	
Finger Lakes National Heritage Area	New York	Study completed 2023, criteria met	

== See also ==
- African-American Heritage Sites (U.S. National Park Service)
- Hispanic Heritage Sites (U.S. National Park Service)
- Native American Heritage Sites (U.S. National Park Service)
- Women's History Sites (U.S. National Park Service)
