= Sangre de Cristo National Heritage Area =

United States National Heritage Area in Colorado

Coordinates: 37.4705°N 105.8657°W

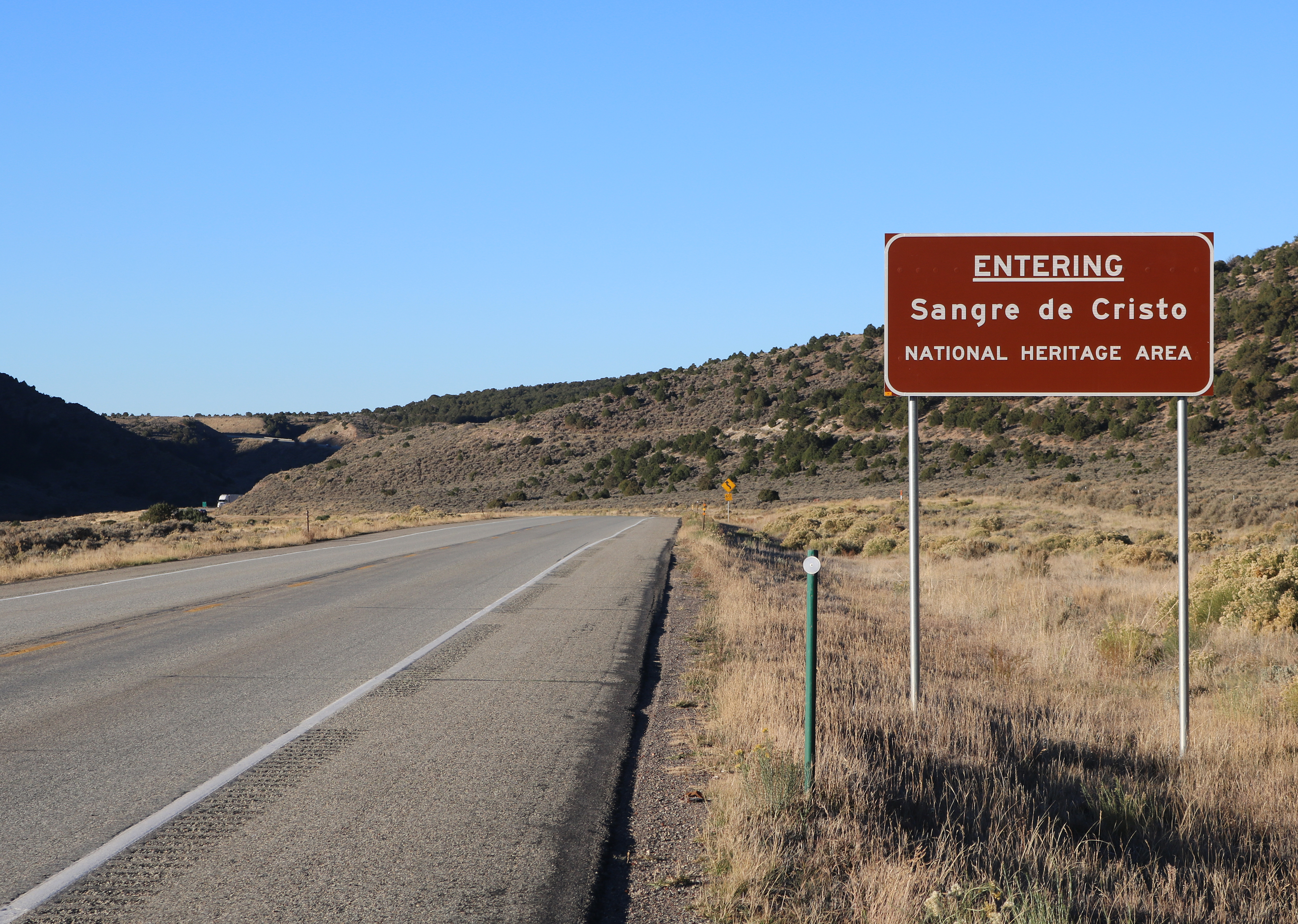
Entering the area from the east on Highway 160

Sangre de Cristo National Heritage Area is a federally designated National Heritage Area in the south central portion of the U.S. state of Colorado. The heritage area includes the San Luis Valley and portions of the Sangre de Cristo Range. The region combines influences of Anglo-American, Hispano-American and Native American influences. It also includes portions of the upper Rio Grande valley.

== Extent ==
The national heritage area includes Alamosa, Costilla, and Conejos counties, and portions of Saguache and Rio Grande counties. It also includes within its boundaries Great Sand Dunes National Park and Preserve, Baca National Wildlife Refuge, the Sangre de Cristo Wilderness, the South San Juan Wilderness, Sangre de Cristo Wilderness Area, San Luis Wilderness Study Area, Monte Vista National Wildlife Refuge, Alamosa National Wildlife Refuge and the Medano-Zapata Ranch. Other features include the Trujillo Homestead, a National Historic Landmark.

== Cultural preservation ==
The area overlaps with the "Hispano Homeland", the ethnically distinct Hispanic population in the upper Rio Grande Valley and adjoining uplands, as described by academic, Richard Nostrand. The national heritage area was established to preserve and promote the region's distinctive cultural and natural features. The San Luis Valley was culturally isolated for much of its history, preserving a distinctive local Spanish dialect and vocabulary. A high proportion of the local population is descended from Hispanos, Spanish colonial settlers who arrived in the area in the 1850s, the first permanent European settlers in Colorado.

Sangre de Cristo National Heritage Area was established by the Omnibus Public Land Management Act of 2009.
