= National Coal Heritage Area =

United States National Heritage Area in West Virginia

Coordinates: 38°00′N 81°30′W

The National Coal Heritage Area (NCHA) is a federally designated National Heritage Area encompassing a region of thirteen counties in West Virginia that were the source of "smokeless" bituminous coal through much of the 20th century. The National Heritage Area recognizes the area's cultural and historic qualities and serves to promote tourism, historic preservation and economic development in the region. The idea of the NCHA was first proposed in the early 1990s by Congressman Nick Rahall, and was established on November 12, 1996 by the 1996 Omnibus Parks and Public Lands Management Act. The designated area includes Boone, Cabell, Fayette, Logan, Lincoln, McDowell, Mercer, Mingo, Raleigh, Summers, and Wayne counties.

Exploitation of coal in West Virginia began in the 1840s with the mining and refining of cannel coal in the Kanawha Valley. The principal coal fields in the Heritage Area include the New River, Winding Gulf and Flat Top-Pocahontas coal fields, of which the Pocahontas No. 3 seam was the most valuable. As the coalfields were exploited a network of railroads were developed, primarily by the Chesapeake and Ohio, the Norfolk and Western and the Virginian railways, the latter two associated with the Pocahontas and Winding Gulf fields, respectively. Large industrial corporations acquired extensive holdings as well, with U.S. Steel's U.S. Coal and Coke subsidiary controlling large portions of the Pocahontas and the New River Company and Winding Gulf Collieries controlling their respective regions.
