= Champlain Valley National Heritage Area =

United States National Heritage Area in Vermont and New York

Coordinates: 44.53°N 73.33°W

The Champlain Valley National Heritage Area is a federally designated National Heritage Area encompassing eleven counties in New York and Vermont surrounding Lake Champlain. The heritage area designation recognizes the area's historical and scenic significance. The region was a strategic corridor between the Hudson Valley of the United States and the Richelieu Valley of Quebec during the American Revolution in the late 18th century, and saw considerable military action during the War of 1812. During the American Civil War the valley was a part of the Underground Railroad network.

The National Heritage Area encompasses Clinton, Essex, Warren, Saratoga and Washington counties in New York, and Bennington, Rutland, Addison, Chittenden, Franklin and Grand Isle counties in Vermont.

Attractions located within the National Heritage Area include Fort Ticonderoga, the Lake Champlain Maritime Museum, Saratoga National Historical Park, portions of Adirondack Park and Green Mountain National Forest, Missisquoi National Wildlife Refuge and the Lake Champlain Underwater Historic Preserves.

The Champlain Valley National Heritage Area was established by the Champlain Valley National Heritage Act of 2005. It is administered by the Champlain Valley National Heritage Partnership.
