= Mississippi Hills National Heritage Area =

United States National Heritage Area in Mississippi

Coordinates: 34.575011°N 88.691755°W

Mississippi Hills National Heritage Area is a federally designated National Heritage Area in the northeastern portion of the U.S. state of Mississippi. The designation commemorates the region's impact on American culture and its role in the American Civil War and the American civil rights movement. The national heritage area designation provides a unified marketing and promotion framework for the area.

The national heritage area covers all of Marshall, Benton, Tippah, Alcorn, Tishomingo, Lafayette, Union, Pontotoc, Lee, Itawamba, Calhoun, Chickasaw and Monroe counties, and those portions of Desoto, Tate, Panola, Yalobusha, Grenada and Montgomery counties to the east of Interstate 55 and north of Mississippi Highway 14. Significant sites within the national heritage area include Brice's Crossroads National Battlefield and the birthplace of Elvis Presley.

Mississippi Hills National Heritage Area was established by the Omnibus Public Land Management Act of 2009.
