= Blue Ridge National Heritage Area =

Coordinates: 35.565920°N 82.485834°W

The Blue Ridge National Heritage Area is a federally designated National Heritage Area encompassing the twenty-five westernmost counties of North Carolina, which are associated with the Blue Ridge Mountains. The designation provides a framework for the promotion and interpretation of the area's cultural and historic character, and the preservation of the natural and built environment. The National Heritage Area includes the North Carolina portions of Great Smoky Mountains National Park and the Blue Ridge Parkway. Other attractions include Mount Mitchell in Pisgah National Forest, Nantahala National Forest and the North Carolina portion of the Appalachian Trail. The Qualla Boundary of the Eastern Band of Cherokee Indians is also within the National Heritage Area. The area's musical heritage and folk craftsmanship are also recognized by the National Heritage Area.

The National Heritage Area includes Alleghany, Ashe, Avery, Buncombe, Burke, Caldwell, Cherokee, Clay, Graham, Haywood, Henderson, Jackson, McDowell, Macon, Madison, Mitchell, Polk, Rutherford, Surry, Swain, Transylvania, Watauga, Wilkes, Yadkin and Yancey counties.

The Blue Ridge National Heritage Area was established 10 Nov 2003 by Public Law 108-108.
