= Susquehanna National Heritage Area =

United States National Heritage Area in Pennsylvania

- Location within Pennsylvania Location within the United States
- Location: Pennsylvania, United States
- Coordinates: 39°58′39″N 76°29′48″W
- Established: 2019
- Governing body: Susquehanna Heritage Corporation
- Website: www.susquehannaheritage.org

Susquehanna National Heritage Area is a federally designated National Heritage Area in south-central Pennsylvania. The national heritage area commemorates and promotes the region surrounding the Susquehanna River.

The national heritage area includes all of Lancaster County and York County.

The Susquehanna National Heritage Area was first introduced in 2008, and was established in 2019. It is administered by the Susquehanna Heritage Corporation which was created in 2002. It is based out of the Zimmerman Center for Heritage in Wrightsville, Pennsylvania, a historic home dating to the early 1700s. The corporation also manages the Columbia Crossing River Trails Center in Columbia, Pennsylvania. It is a member of the Alliance of National Heritage Areas and HeritagePA, a statewide network covering Pennsylvania's Heritage Areas.

The National Heritage Area began giving free boat tours of Lake Clarke starting in 2019.

In 2020, the National Heritage Area was awarded $1,500,000 from the state of Pennsylvania to expand and construct a new discovery center.
