= Terry Wentz =

American parks manager (1947–2010)

- Terry Wentz in 2008
- Born: June 4, 1947; Hanover, Pennsylvania
- Died: May 30, 2010 (aged 62); Roaring Spring, Pennsylvania, USA
- Education: Penn State University
- Scientific career
- Fields: Progressive management, environmental education
- Workplaces: Pennsylvania State Parks, Pennsylvania Department of Conservation and Natural Resources, Audubon Society, Lower Trail

Terry Wentz was a Pennsylvania State Parks manager who served with the state for 34 years at four locations throughout South Central Pennsylvania including Canoe Creek State Park, Trough Creek State Park, and Warriors Path State Park. He is most noted for his work in progressive management and environmental education.

He founded Waxwing Associates, an eco-tourism company that also provided wildlife management consulting and grant writing services. Wentz is noted for his work with the largest little brown bat colony east of the Mississippi River, which is located in an abandoned church at Canoe Creek State Park. His conservation efforts have also resulted in further protections for the endangered Indiana bats which reside in Canoe Creek State Park in an abandoned mine. Wentz is noted as one of the founding members of Rails To Trails of Central Pennsylvania. His efforts in acquiring grants for land helped to establish the Lower Trail. He also served time in Vietnam as a dog handler for the United States Army assigned to the 1st Cavalry Division. Wentz was also a past president of the Juniata Valley Audubon Society, and served on the Juniata Valley Audubon board for over a decade. He helped develop a benefit horse ride trail for Dreams Go On, an organization that provides therapeutic horseback riding sessions to adults and children who are physically challenged, receive mental health, behavioral health or family therapy services.

== Dedications ==
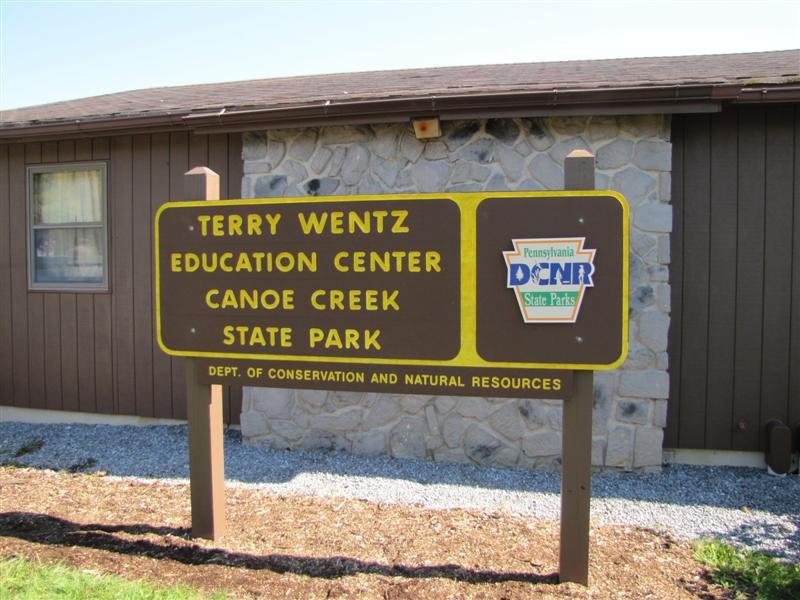
The sign marking the Terry Wentz Education Center at Canoe Creek State Park

On October 2, 2010, the Canoe Creek Environmental Center at Canoe Creek State Park was named after Terry Wentz. On May 15, 2011, the first annual Terry Wentz Memorial Hike was held at Canoe Creek State Park.

== Awards ==
The Bureau of State Parks honored Wentz's longstanding work with bluebirds with a posthumous Cavity Nesting Monitor of the Year award.

Wentz also won the American Trails, Trail Worker of the Year award in November 2010. The honor was awarded posthumously to his wife, Debbie.
