= Wheeling National Heritage Area =

United States National Heritage Area in West Virginia

Coordinates: 40°0′N 80°45′W

Wheeling National Heritage Area is a federally designated National Heritage Area comprising the city of Wheeling, West Virginia and its industrial heritage associated with the region's steel industry and the commerce generated by the Ohio River. Products made in Wheeling included steel, iron, glass, tobacco products and nails. The existence of river crossings by road and rail, combined with access to river traffic, made Wheeling an important inland port.

Major sites associated with the national heritage area include the Wheeling Suspension Bridge and the La Belle Iron Works.
