= Owens River Headwaters Wilderness =

Protected wilderness area in California, United States

- IUCN category Ib (wilderness area)
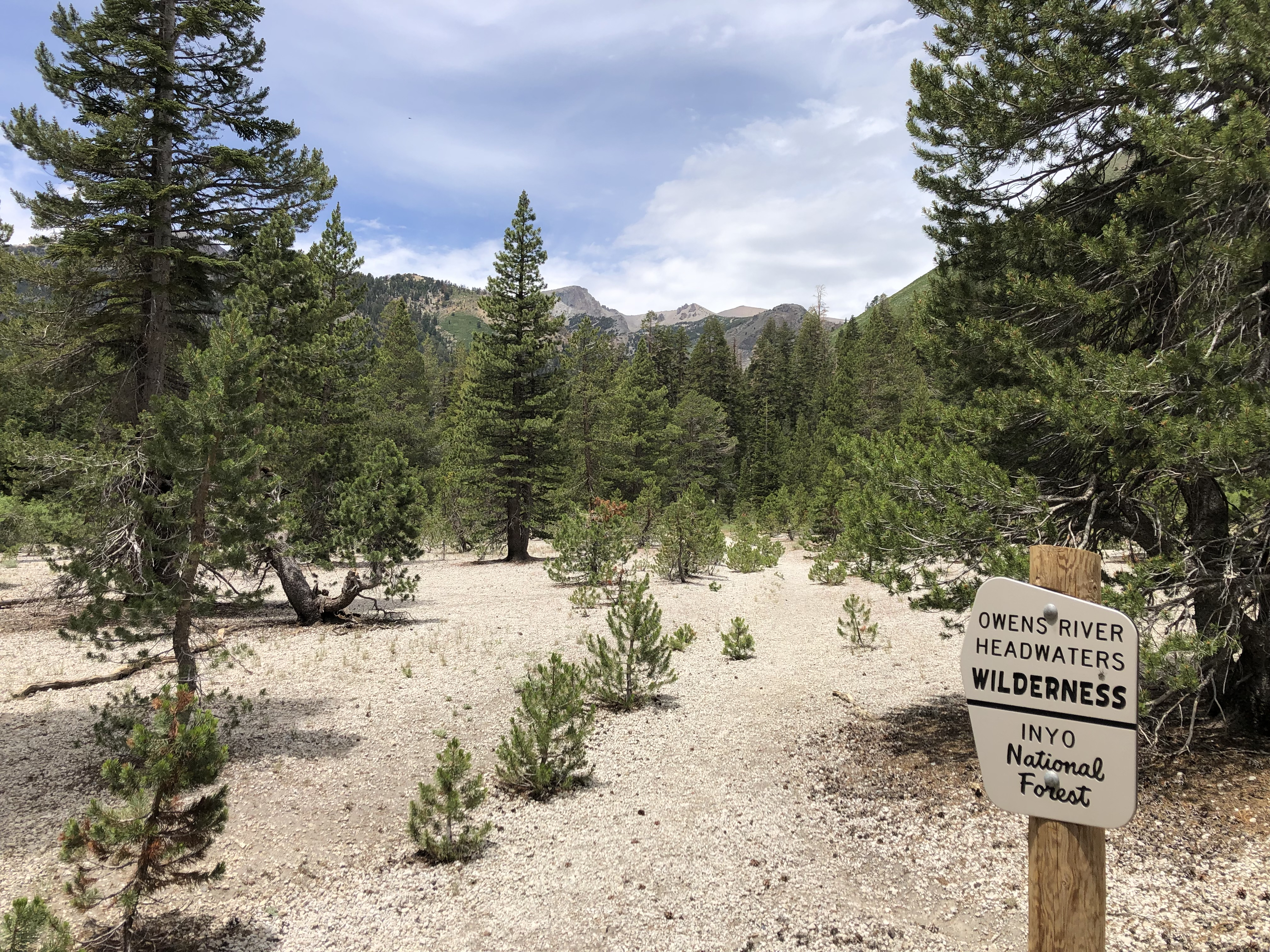
- Sign at Wilderness boundary

- Location within California Location within the United States
- Location: Mono County, California USA
- Nearest city: Mammoth Lakes, CA
- Coordinates: 37°43′18″N 119°03′26″W
- Area: 14,721 acres (59.57 km^{2})
- Established: March 30, 2009
- Governing body: U.S. Forest Service

National Wild and Scenic Rivers System
- Type: Wild, Recreational
- Designated: March 30, 2009

The Owens River Headwaters Wilderness is a wilderness area inside the Inyo National Forest in eastern California designated to protect the headwaters of the Owens River. The wilderness area was created on March 30, 2009, when the Omnibus Public Land Management Act of 2009 was signed into law. This area is home to the largest old growth red fir forest in the region.

== Topography ==
The Owens River Headwaters Wilderness is bounded on the west by the San Joaquin Ridge and the north by the June Mountain Ski Area. This area receives more moisture than average for the east side of the Sierra Nevada due to the relatively low elevation of the mountain ridge to the west. These conditions have allowed for the growth of heavily forested ridges and wet alpine meadows that are more typically seen on the west side of the Sierra Nevada.

Notable features within the wilderness area include over 100 natural springs and seeps, and Glass Creek Meadow, the largest subalpine meadows in the central eastern Sierra Nevada Mountains.

== Wildlife ==
The Owens River Headwaters are an important point on the migration route of many animals, including mule deer, pine marten and Sierra Nevada bighorn sheep. Glass Creek Meadow is home to a population of the endangered Yosemite toad and a large diversity of butterflies. The Owens River is home to several species of trout.

== Archeology ==
Glass Creek, a tributary of the Owens River, was a source of obsidian for Native American tribes. Evidence of Native American habitation in this area dates back approximately 10,000 years.

== Recreation ==
The Owens River Headwaters Wilderness is a popular destination for birdwatching and hiking. The area was popular for off-road vehicle use, but after the area's designation as a protected wilderness, such activities have been severally curtailed.

The Upper Owens River area is a popular location for fly fishing and hosts a large population of brown trout and rainbow trout.

The Owens River Headwaters Wilderness is also a popular destination for nudists, who use the location for volleyball and cookouts.
