= Mississippi Delta National Heritage Area =

United States National Heritage Area in Mississippi

Coordinates: 34.318085°N 90.454564°W

Mississippi Delta National Heritage Area is a federally designated National Heritage Area that seeks to preserve and promote the landscape, culture and history of the Mississippi Delta in the northwestern portion of the U.S. state of Mississippi. The region is famous for blues music and a unique culture that has had broad influence on music and literature, both in the United States and worldwide.

The national heritage area comprises Bolivar, Carroll, Coahoma, Desoto, Holmes, Humphreys, Issaquena, Leflore, Panola, Quitman, Sharkey, Tallahatchie, Tate, Tunica, Warren, Washington and Yazoo counties.

Mississippi Delta National Heritage Area was established by the Omnibus Public Land Management Act of 2009. A management and development plan is being developed.
