= South Park National Heritage Area =

United States National Heritage Area in Colorado

Coordinates: 38°58′N 106°03′W

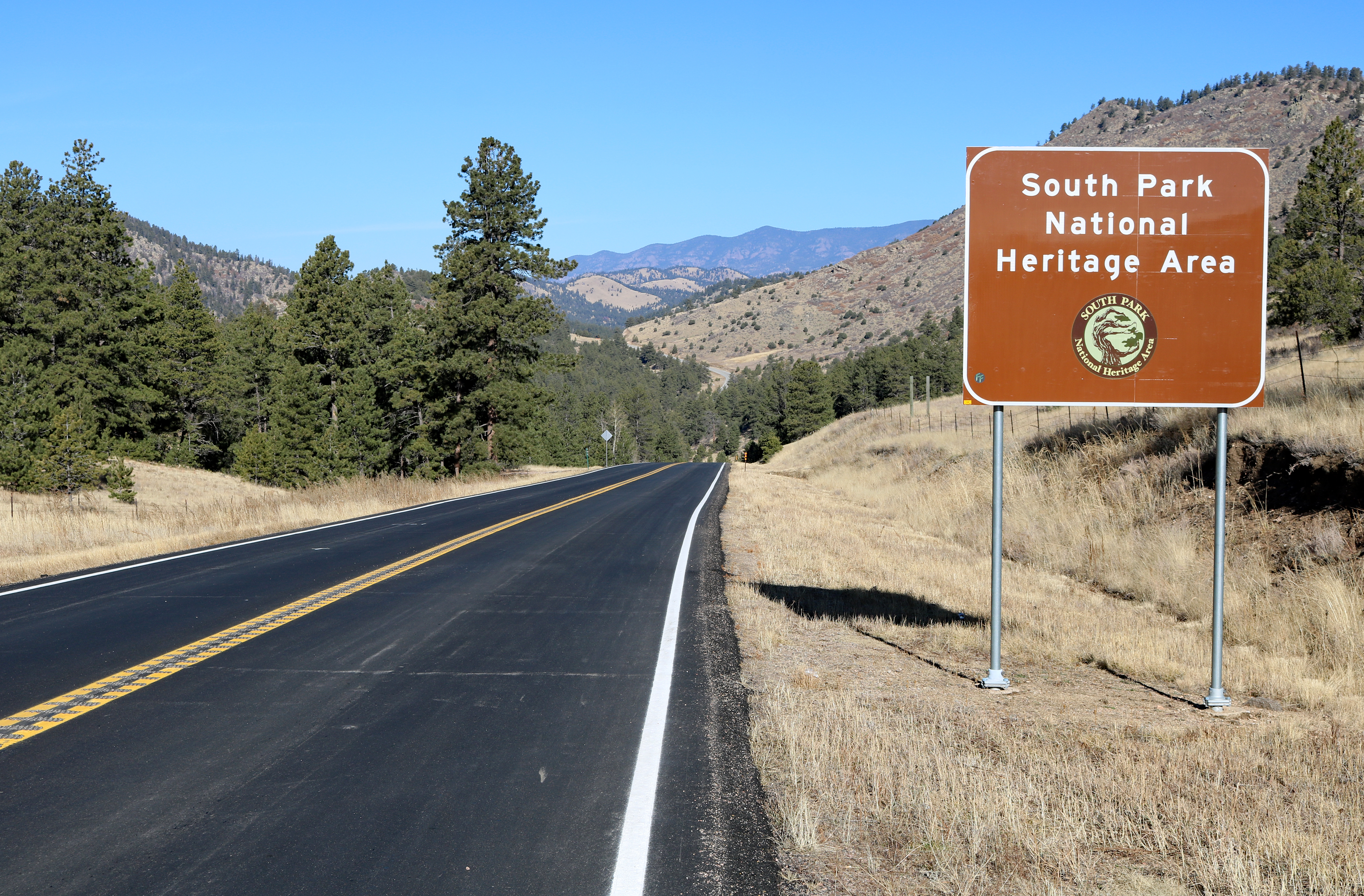
Entering from the south on Colorado State Highway 9

South Park National Heritage Area is a U.S. National Heritage Area encompassing the South Park of Colorado. Established on March 30, 2009, by the Omnibus Public Land Management Act of 2009 (Pub. L. 111–11 (text) (PDF)§7002), the South Park NHA is managed by the Park County, Colorado Office of Tourism to promote and interpret the area's natural, scenic, and cultural resources. The National Heritage Area designation funds promotion of the area's mining, recreation, and ranching heritage.

The National Heritage Area covers the majority of Park County, including the communities of Lake George, Hartsel, Fairplay, Como, Tarryall, Jefferson and Alma, all roughly within South Park or the surrounding mountains. The area includes portions of the Mosquito Range, the Buffalo Peaks Wilderness, the Lost Creek Wilderness, and the Lost Creek National Natural Landmark.
