= Freedom's Way National Heritage Area =

United States National Heritage Area in Massachusetts and New Hampshire

Freedom's Way National Heritage Area is a federally designated National Heritage Area encompassing portions of northern Massachusetts and southern New Hampshire. The heritage area includes sites significant to the American Revolution, cultural sites associated with Ralph Waldo Emerson and Henry David Thoreau, and Native American sites. The heritage area seeks to preserve the region's landscape and historic structures.

The National Heritage Area includes Minute Man National Historical Park, portions of Middlesex and Worcester counties in Massachusetts, and portions of Hillsborough County, New Hampshire, an area including a total of 45 communities in the two states. The designated area also includes portions of Great Meadows National Wildlife Refuge.

Freedom's Way National Heritage Area was established by the Omnibus Public Land Management Act of 2009.
