= Shenandoah Valley Battlefields National Historic District =

United States National Heritage Area in Virginia

Coordinates: 38°46′N 78°31′W

The Shenanandoah Valley Battlefields National Historic District is a National Heritage Area in Virginia. The district comprises eight counties in the Shenandoah Valley, including the scene of Jackson's Valley Campaign of 1862, Lee's Gettysburg Campaign of 1863 and Sheridan's Shenandoah Campaign of 1864.

Battlefields within the District area include the sites of the First and Second battles of Kernstown, the First, Second and Third battles of Winchester and the Battle of New Market.

Berkeley and Jefferson counties in West Virginia are seeking to be added to the district.
