= Essex National Heritage Area =

United States National Heritage Area in Massachusetts

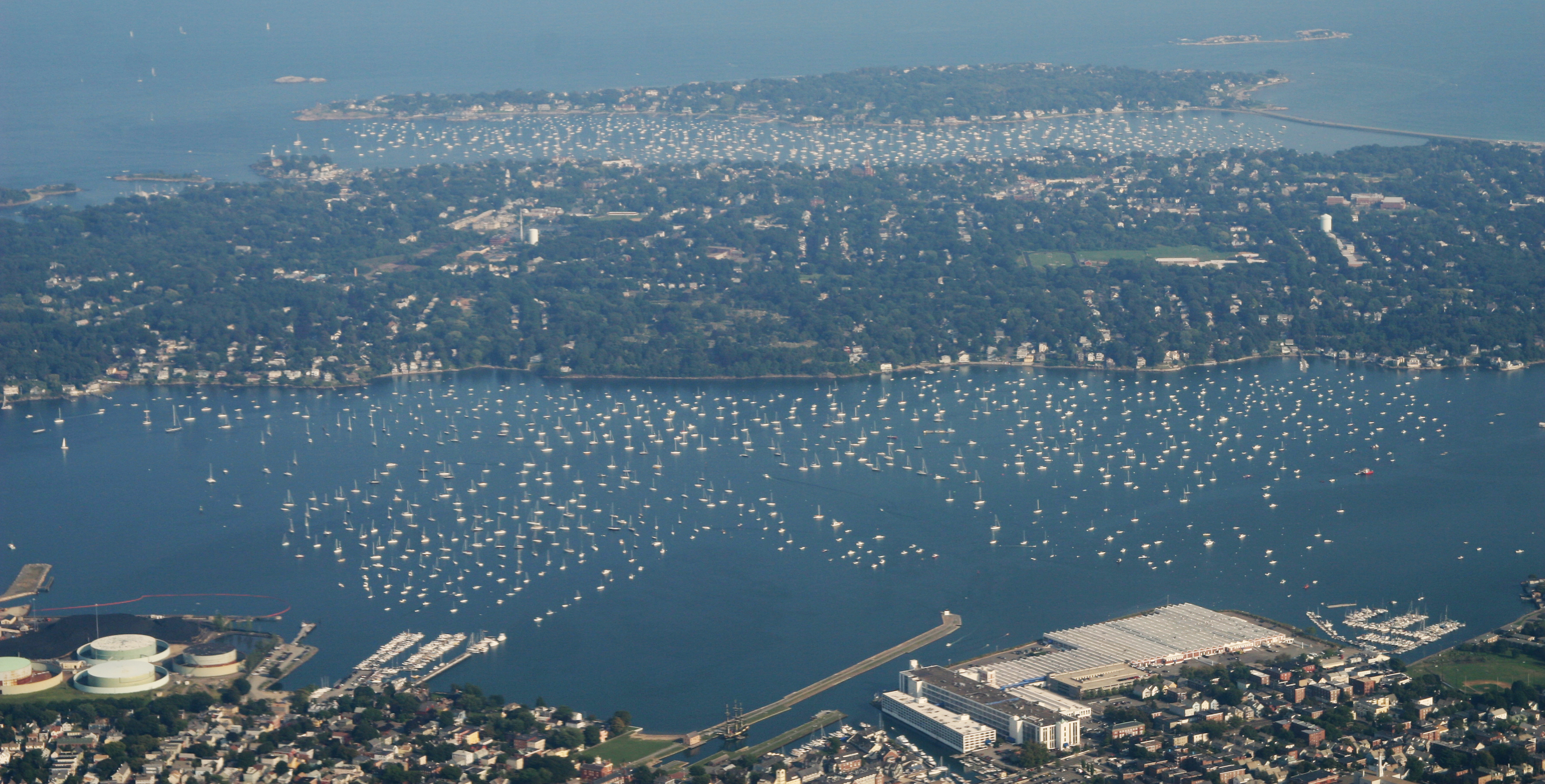
- Aerial view of Salem Willows in Salem, Massachusetts. Also pictured are Marblehead, Massachusetts and its harbor.

- Location within Massachusetts Location within the United States
- 42°39′47.8″N 70°57′30.2″W
- Type: Historical
- Location: Essex County, Massachusetts

History
- Founded: 1996

Site notes
- Area: 828 square miles (2,140 km^{2})
- Governing body: Essex National Heritage Commission
- Visitors: 2.7 million (yearly)

The Essex National Heritage Area is a National Heritage Area composed of all of Essex County, Massachusetts. It is overseen by the Essex National Heritage Commission (ENHC), a non-profit organization based in Salem, Massachusetts. The commission promotes the cultural heritage with public and private partnerships and with the National Park Service by developing programs that enhance, preserve and encourage regional awareness of the area's unique historic, cultural and natural resources.

== Overview ==
The heritage area covers all of Essex County, including 34 cities and towns, 9,968 sites listed on the National Register of Historic Places, 26 National Historic Landmarks, 9 state parks, and 2 National Park Service units.

Along with 2.7 million annual visitors, roughly 743,159 residents live in the region, which is in the Greater Boston metropolitan area.

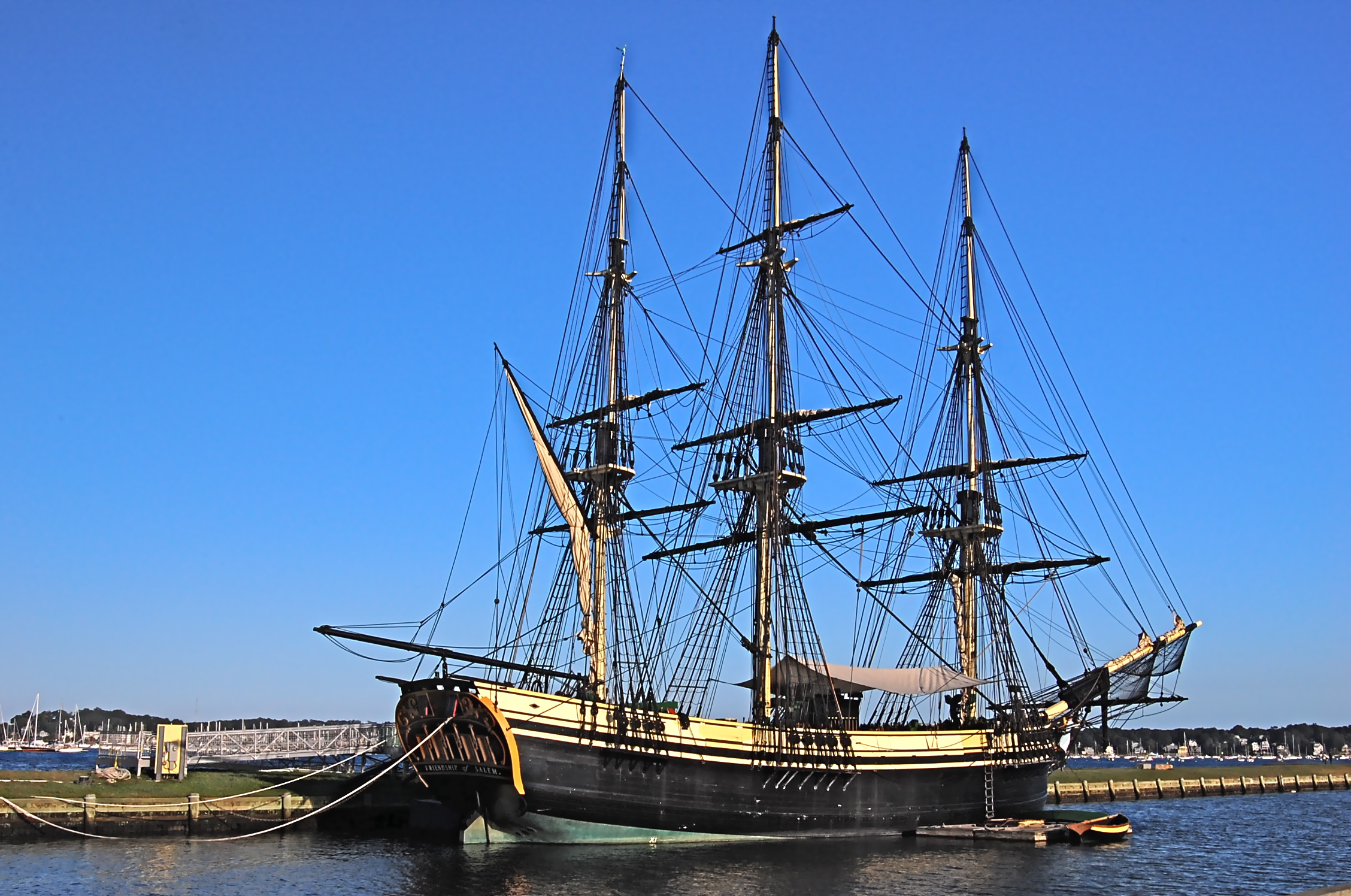
The Friendship of Salem sails as an ambassador for the Essex National Heritage Area and is part of the Salem Maritime National Historic Site.

=== Cities and towns ===
The heritage area includes the Merrimack Valley cities of Lawrence, Haverhill, and Amesbury, Massachusetts, which were important industrial and trade centers in the 18th and 19th centuries and the birthplace of the Industrial Revolution in North America (along with nearby Lowell, Massachusetts), as well as the coastal cities of Newburyport, Gloucester, Marblehead and Salem, Massachusetts, also important locations in early American trade and history.

== Event and programs ==
The Essex National Heritage Commission has sponsored a number of events and programs that celebrate the region's history, character and cultural heritage. These include:

- Essex Heritage Partnership Grant Program
- Border to Boston – an Eight Community Recreational Path
- Teaching American History Grants
  - Using ESSEX History
  - LINCs
- Area Guides
  - First Period Guide to Architecture
  - Guide to the Great Outdoors
  - Guide to Farms and Agriculture
- Trails & Sails: Two Weekends of Walks and Water
- Future Leaders
- Essex Heritage Explorers Membership Program
- Visitor Centers
- Heritage Landscape Inventory
- Essex Heritage Scenic Byway
- Photo Safaris
