= Spring Basin Wilderness =

Wilderness area in Oregon, United States

- IUCN category Ib (wilderness area)
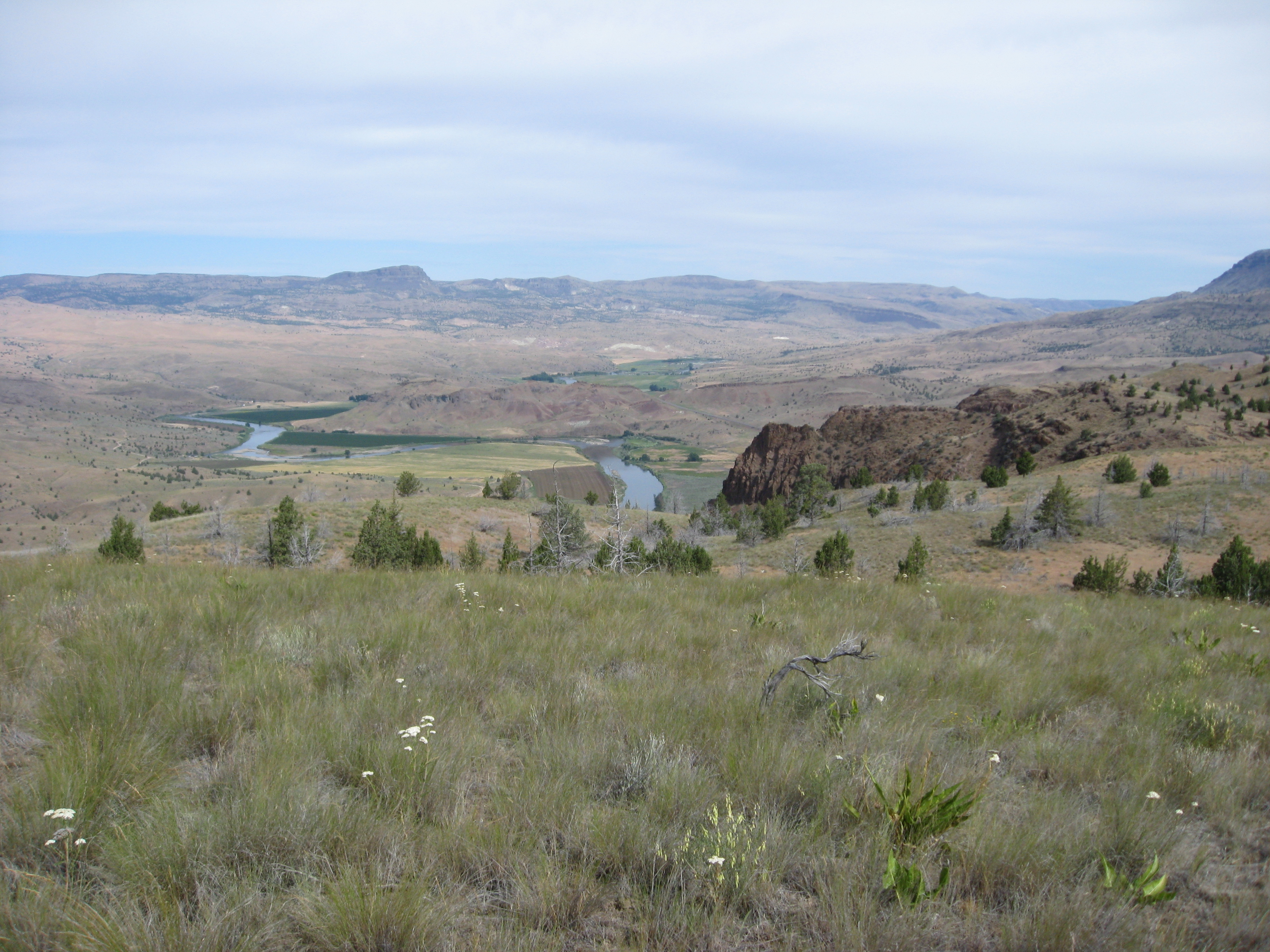
- The Spring Basin Wilderness

- Location within the United States
- Location: Wheeler County, Oregon, United States
- Nearest city: Fossil, OR
- Coordinates: 44°54′N 120°24′W
- Area: 6,382 acres (2,583 ha)
- Established: United States Bureau of Land Management

Spring Basin Wilderness is a 6,382-acre (2,583 ha) wilderness area located near the town of Clarno in the U.S. state of Oregon. It was created by the Omnibus Public Land Management Act of 2009, which was signed into law by President Barack Obama on March 30, 2009.

Bordered by the John Day River, the wilderness comprises rugged cliffs, remote canyons and colorful geologic features. Common wildlife species in the area include mule deer, golden eagle, prairie falcon, bobcat, California quail, mountain bluebird, and western meadowlark.

== See also ==
- List of Oregon Wildernesses
- List of U.S. Wilderness Areas
