= Baca National Wildlife Refuge =

Wildlife refuge in Colorado, United States

- IUCN category IV (habitat/species management area)
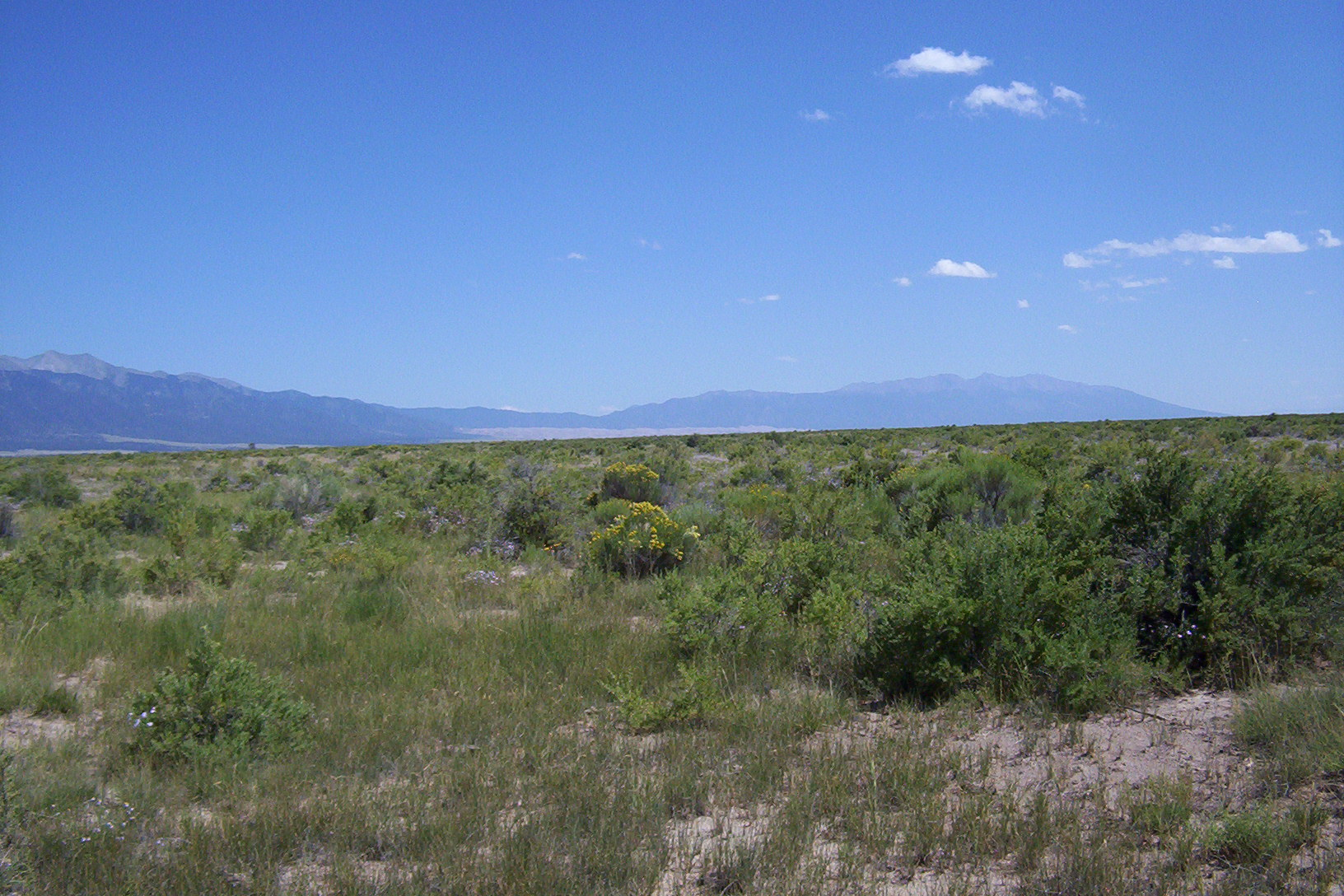
- View southeast from the northwest corner of the original Luis Maria Baca Grant #4, now included in the Baca NWR, the Great Sand Dunes and the Sangre de Cristo Range are in the background

- Location within the United States
- Location: Saguache & Alamosa counties, Colorado, United States
- Nearest city: Alamosa
- Coordinates: 37°52′N 105°48′W
- Area: 78,697 acres (318.48 km^{2})
- Established: 2003
- Governing body: U.S. Fish and Wildlife Service
- Website: Baca National Wildlife Refuge

The Baca National Wildlife Refuge is a 78,697-acre (31,848 ha) United States National Wildlife Refuge located in southern Colorado. It is within the Sangre de Cristo National Heritage Area.

== Fauna ==
Many bird species such as the kestrel, great horned owl, northern flicker, robin, yellow warbler, and Bullock's oriole roam in the riparian areas of this refuge. Waterfowl that inhabit here include mallard, pintail, teal, Canada goose, avocet, killdeer, white-faced ibis, egret, and heron.

== Geography ==
The wildlife refuge is located on the lands of the Luis Maria Baca Grant No. 4 near Crestone, Colorado in the San Luis Valley in southern Saguache and northern Alamosa counties, about 30 miles (48 km) northeast of the town of Alamosa, on the west side of the Sangre de Cristo Range.

The site was authorized by the United States Congress in 2000 as part of legislation that also authorized the nearby Great Sand Dunes National Park. It was formally established in 2003 when administration began under the United States Fish and Wildlife Service. It is administered jointly with the nearby Alamosa and Monte Vista National Wildlife Refuges, as part of the Alamosa/Baca/Monte Verde Complex.

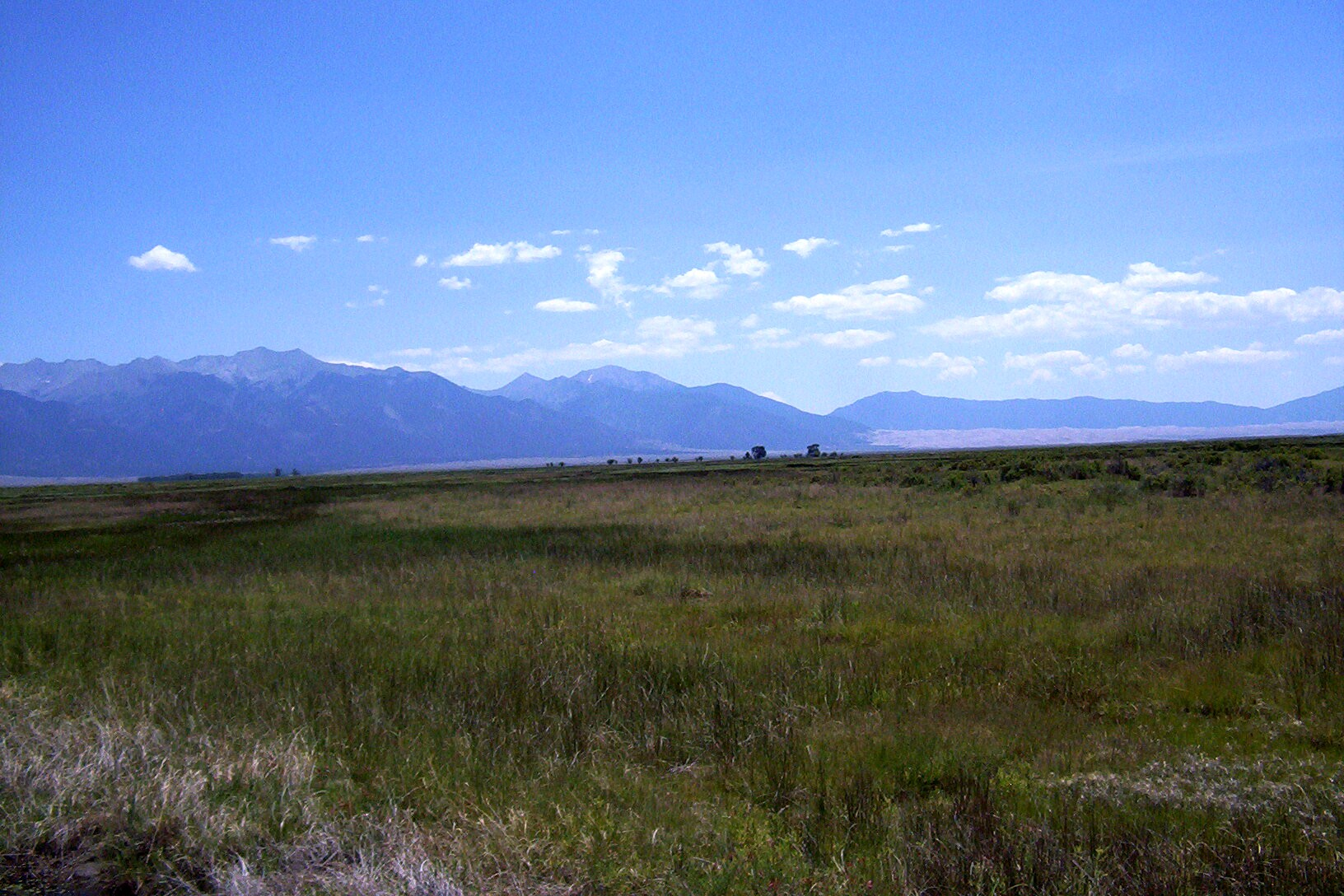
Wet hay meadow on the Baca National Wildlife Refuge in July 2008

== Description ==
The Baca National Wildlife Refuge consists of rangeland and some riparian wetlands. The original ranch headquarters and other buildings are on the wildlife refuge. As is usual on federal wildlife refuges, grazing and hay production continue on a limited basis. It includes several thousand acres of irrigated hay meadows.

Several streams arising in the nearby Sangre de Cristos flow onto the Refuge. Crestone Creek in its lower reaches is a spring-fed perennial stream inhabited by four native fish species: Rio Grande sucker (Catostomus plebeius), Rio Grande chub (Gila pandora), fathead minnow (Pimephales promelas), and longnose dace (Rhinichthys cataractae)

== History ==
The establishment of the refuge and national park was part of complex land transfers undertaken by the federal government in cooperation with the Nature Conservancy and the State of Colorado. Approximately 3,300 acres (1,300 ha) of the land was previously under the management of the U.S. Bureau of Reclamation and was transferred to the Fish and Wildlife Service.

Approximately 97,036 acres (39,269 ha) of the land for the refuge and park was part of the historic Baca Ranch and was purchased by the Nature Conservancy before its transfer to the federal government. The refuge forms part of complex of wetlands in the San Luis Valley consists of lands of nearby landowners, including the Colorado Board of Land Commissioners, the National Park Service, and the Nature Conservancy.

== Oil and gas exploration ==
The mineral rights to the lands of the Baca NWR are owned by a third party, Lexam Explorations (U.S.A.) Inc. (Lexam). There is believed to be a small chance that commercial quantities of natural gas may be discovered (An existing artesian well on the land, called "the gas well", produced enough gas to heat one home).

=== Draft environmental assessment ===
Litigation by the San Luis Valley Ecosystem Council contesting the environmental assessment with respect to the drilling of two exploratory wells resulted in a settlement in September, 2010 requiring preparation of a new assessment by the U.S. Fish and Wildlife Service.

Proposed executive summary:

Implementation of the Preferred Alternative – the Service is requiring that specific protective measures and standards are followed during all phases of oil and gas exploration being proposed by Lexam, including the intended drilling of two exploratory gas wells on the Refuge, to ensure maximum protection of the surface estate (including all surface and subsurface natural resources not considered minerals) of the Refuge and associated cultural, socioeconomic, and aesthetic resources from unreasonable degradation or impacts. With these requirements incorporated into Lexam's Plan of Operations, potential impacts are expected to be less than significant in regards to NEPA. Information gathered in this Draft EA indicates that the temporary nature of the proposed exploration (<180 days), along with implementation of the preferred alternative, will not unreasonably degrade or result in significant impacts to the surface estate (including all surface and subsurface natural resources not considered to be minerals) of the Refuge and associated cultural, socioeconomic, and aesthetic resources.

=== Public review ===
A public meeting was held in January 2011 at the Colorado College Baca Campus Conference Center in Crestone, Colorado. It was an informational open house with a presentation by the Fish and Wildlife Service followed by a question-and-answer session. Written comments regarding the environmental assessment were accepted at this meeting.

"There's no legal way to say 'no' for that mineral owner to access those minerals," [Mike Blenden, Project Leader, San Luis Valley NWR Complex] said.

Comments can also be sent via mail to David Lucas, Chief, Division of Refuge Planning, U.S. Fish and Wildlife Service, Division of Refuge Planning, P.O. Box 25484, Denver, CO 80225-0486 or via email to: BacaDraftEAComments at fws.gov and must be received no later than February 7, 2011.

The draft assessment includes consideration of the option of purchasing the mineral rights but rejects the $8.4 million demanded by Lexam as not a fair market price. By the terms of a Federal District Court settlement the final environmental assessment is due April 1, 2011.

== Gallery ==
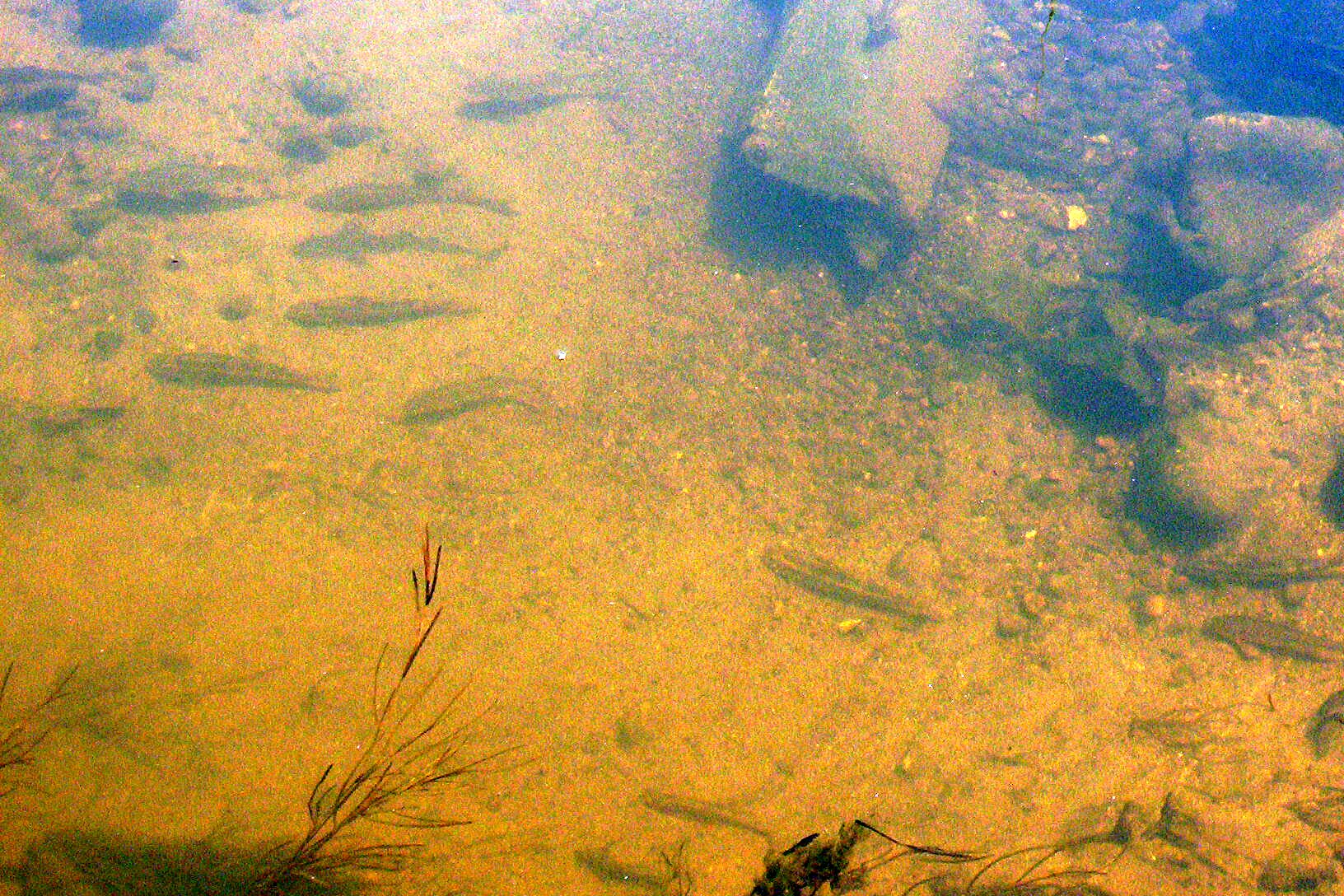
Fish in Crestone Creek

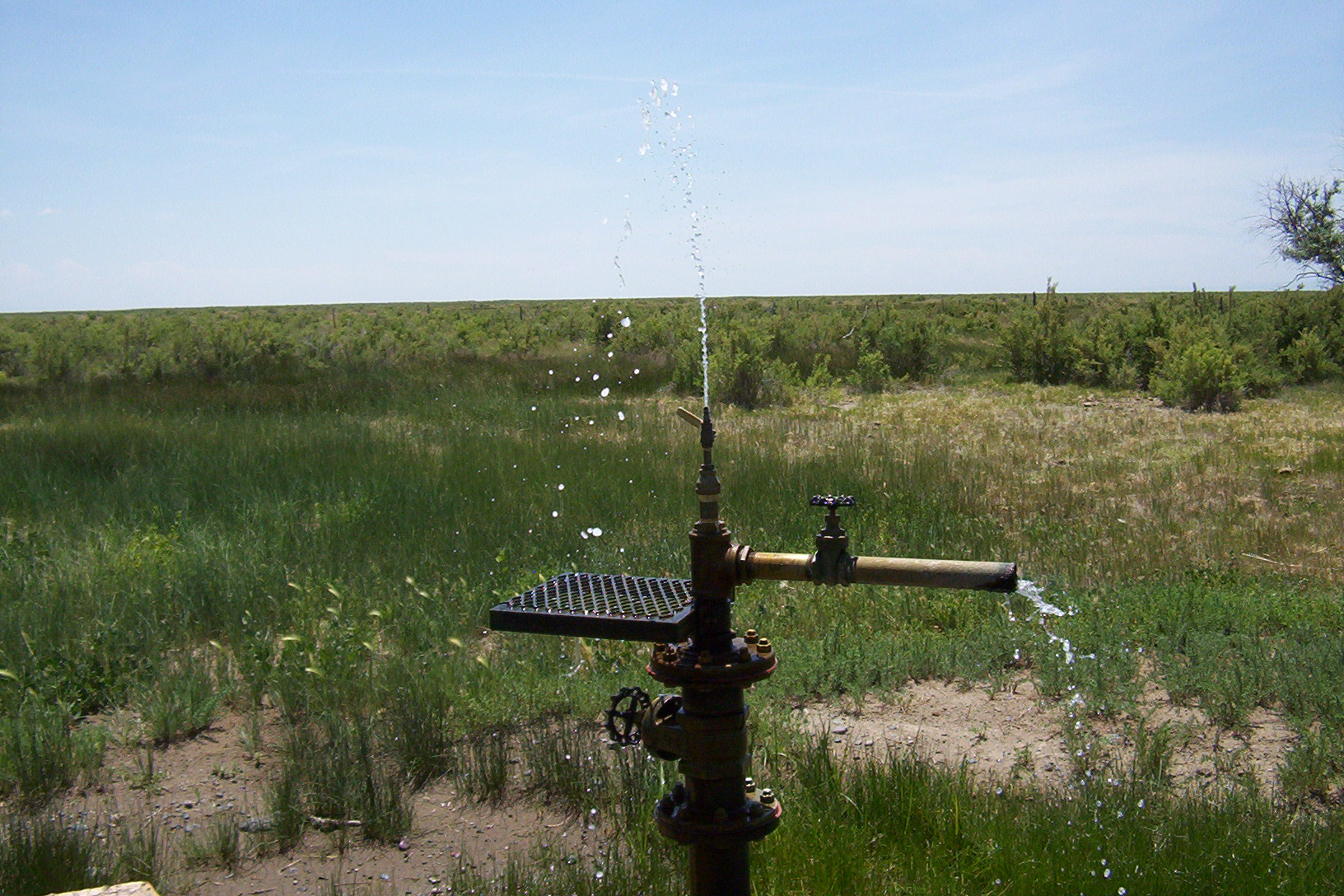
Capped artesian well

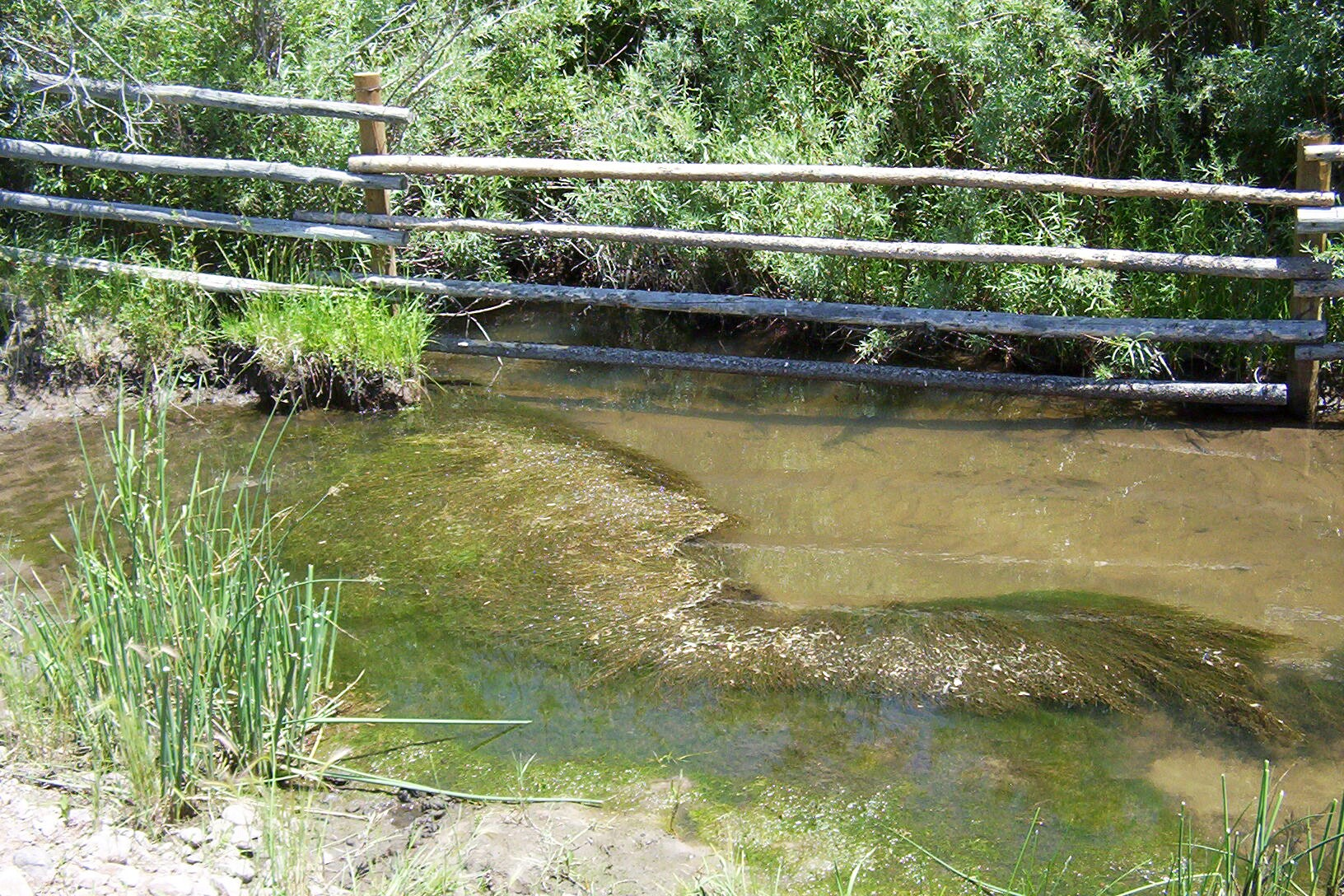
Crestone Creek
