= Kenai Mountains – Turnagain Arm National Heritage Area =

United States National Heritage Area in Alaska

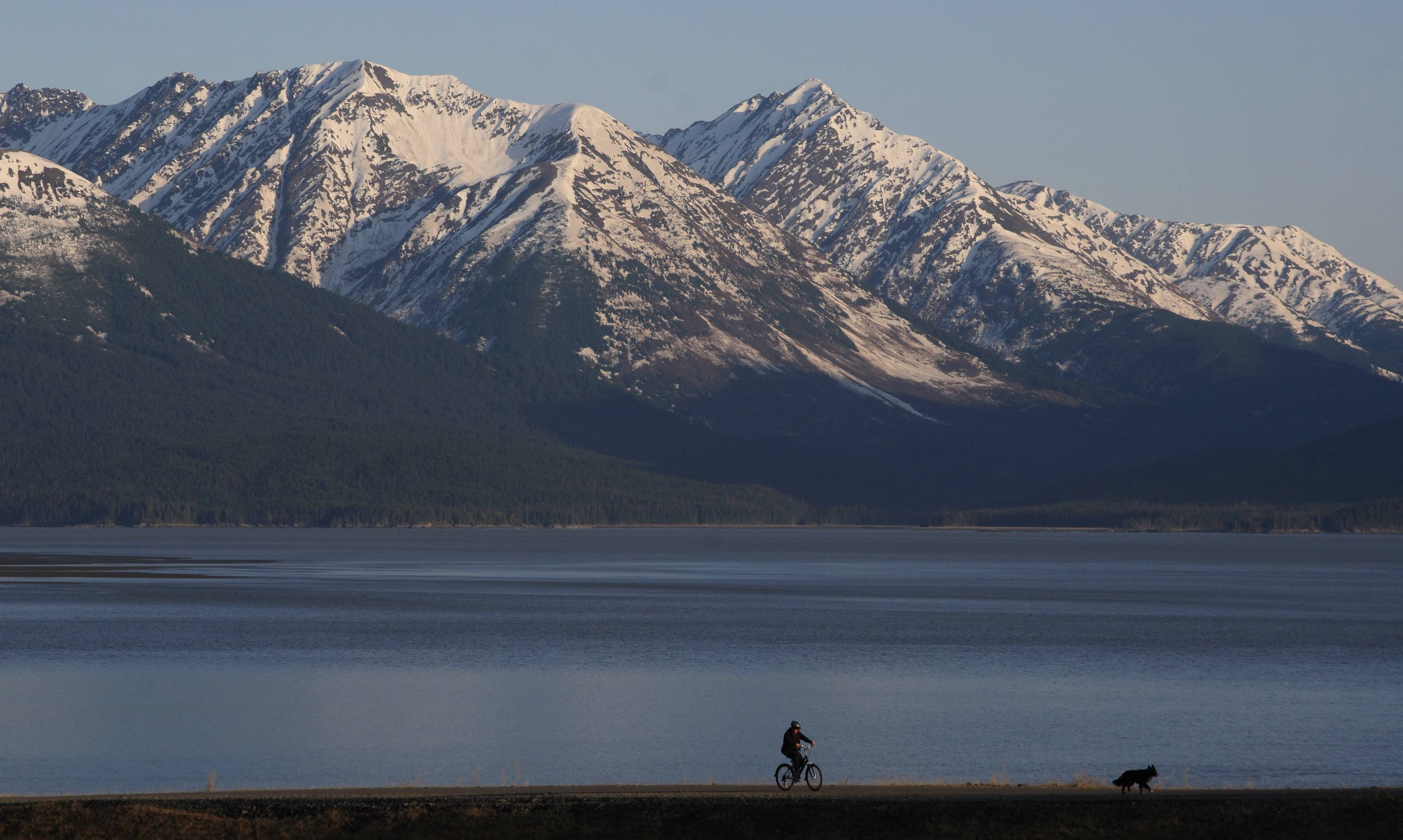
Kenai Mountains as seen over Turnagain Arm

Kenai Mountains – Turnagain Arm National Heritage Area is a federally designated National Heritage Area in the U.S. state of Alaska. The heritage area extends across the northern part of the Kenai Peninsula, immediately to the north and east of Kenai Fjords National Park. The designation recognizes the area's unique cultural, scenic and historical features and provides a unified organization for promotion of the area's attractions.

The Kenai Mountains – Turnagain Arm National Heritage Area (KMTA) includes the road corridor between Seward and Hope and Whittier, from Resurrection Bay in the south to the Turnagain Arm of the Cook Inlet in the north. It includes portions of Chugach National Forest, the Iditarod Trail network, the Alaska Railroad and the Seward Highway.

Communities within KMTA include Seward, Moose Pass, Cooper Landing, Hope, Sunrise, Whittier, Portage, Girdwood and Bird Creek. The western portion of the area was extensively mined, and several mining districts and mining communities are listed on the National Register of Historic Places. Kenai Lake is included within the KMTA's boundaries.

Kenai Mountains-Turnagain Arm National Heritage Area was designated by the Omnibus Public Land Management Act of 2009. It is managed by the KMTA Corridor Communities Association.
