= Mormon Pioneer National Heritage Area =

United States National Heritage Area in Utah

Coordinates: 39°16′23″N 111°38′02″W

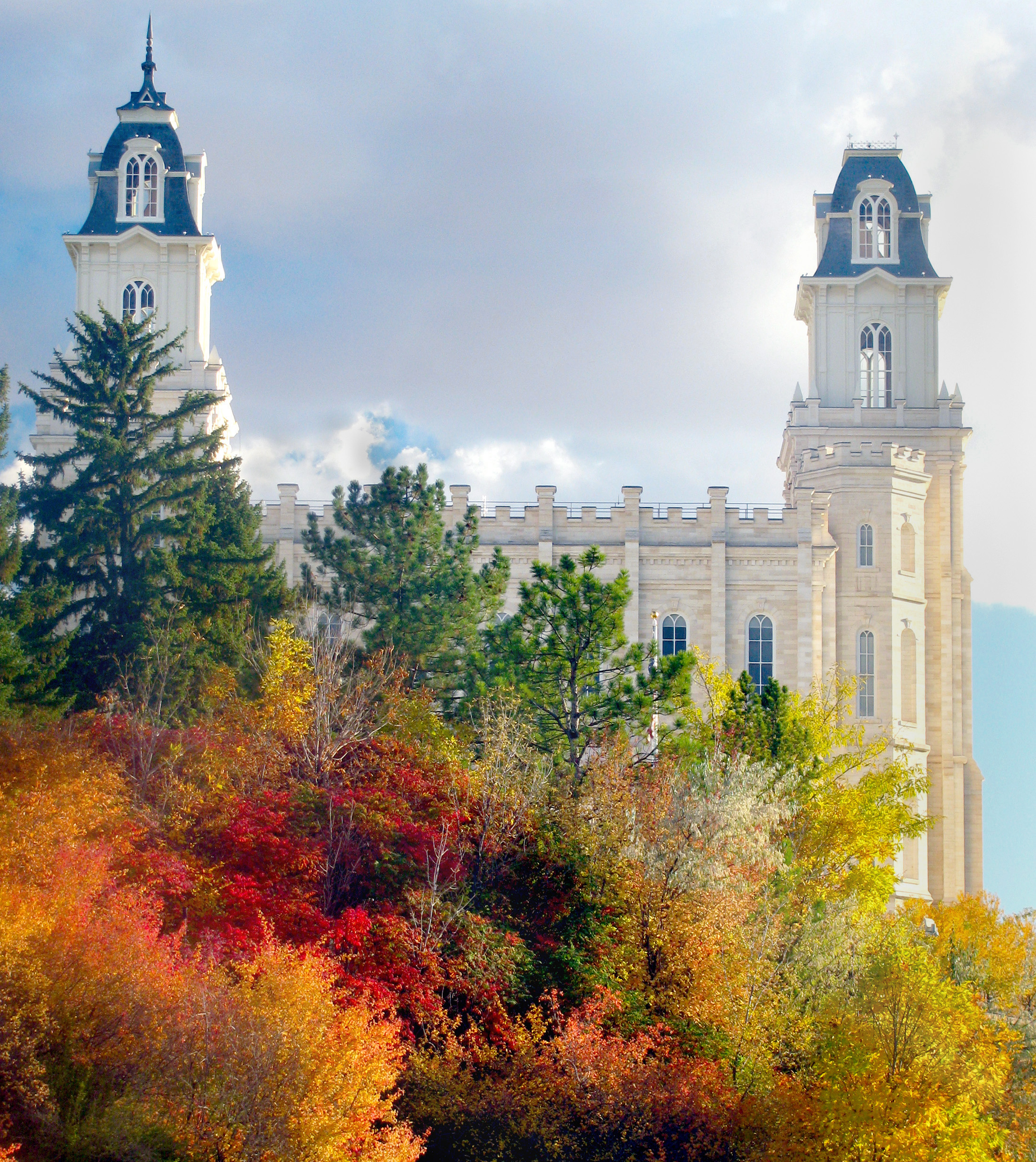
- The Mormon Temple in Manti, Utah is one of the most prominent landmarks and symbols of the MPNHA
- Interactive map of Mormon Pioneer National Heritage Area

The Mormon Pioneer National Heritage Area (MPNHA) is a federally designated National Heritage Area that recognizes and commemorates the efforts of Mormon pioneers who made the trek westward, settling Utah and the American West. Spanning a 400-mile area along U.S. Highway 89, Utah State Route 24 and Utah State Route 12 – an All American Road – the MPNHA encompasses five unique districts, each with its own distinct history and landmarks.

According to its mission statement, the MPNHA "preserves, interprets, promotes, and enhances Utah's pioneer heritage…working to increase tourism, encourage economic development, revitalize communities, provide heritage educational opportunities, and improve the quality of life" within its districts. Furthermore, the area was formulated around three central themes: the interaction of people with the landscape, the interaction of people with each other and the interaction of people with the institutions they created.

The National Heritage Area offers one of the best perspectives of the Mormon colonization experience in the United States. It has been identified by Congress as a factor in the settling and western expansion of the United States.

== History ==
The MPNHA was established by legislation introduced by former Utah Senator Bob Bennett, which, as he said at the time, intended to preserve "the rich heritage and tremendous achievements of the Mormon Pioneers." (Insert link) His bill was passed by Congress in July 2006 and signed into law by President George W. Bush in October of the same year.

In 2010, the U.S. Secretary of the Interior approved a management plan that has funded restoration and revitalization projects heritage area.

== Projects ==
The MPNHA works with the travel councils to realize its goal to preserve the history of both the early Mormon Pioneers as well as other groups who settled central and southern Utah, including the Native Americans, namely the Piute and Ute tribes, highlighting the diversity of the area.

The area also produces the Discovery Road television program, which airs on a number of Utah television stations, including the Utah Educational Network.

== Districts ==
The five districts that make up the MPNHA include the scenic Boulder Loop, which contains Bryce Canyon National Park, The Grand Staircase Escalante National Monument and Anasazi State Park. The Headwaters, encompassing Garfield, Piute and Wayne Counties provide ample opportunities for fishing and historical exploration, being the childhood home of famed outlaw Butch Cassidy. Little Denmark, In Sanpete County, explores the area's Scandinavian heritage. The district also contains the historic Manti Temple, where the annual Mormon Miracle Pageant was held annually until the summer of 2019. Sevier Valley hearkens back to the days of the old west, with families of ranchers and cowboys who have worked their families' land for generations. Finally, the Under the Rim district in Kane County is home to Zion National Park, which attracts 3.5 million visitors per-year.

== See also ==
- Mormon pioneers
- Mormon Trail
- National Heritage Area
