= Maritime Washington National Heritage Area =

United States National Heritage Area in Washington

- Location: Washington, United States
- Established: 2019
- Governing body: Washington Trust for Historic Preservation

Maritime Washington National Heritage Area is a federally designated National Heritage Area in the state of Washington. It encompasses nearly 3000 miles of the state's saltwater shorelines from Grays Harbor County to the Canadian border across 13 counties. It showcases the rich marine history of the Pacific Northwest, and aims to celebrate the diverse cultures of Washington's saltwater shores. The Maritime Washington National Heritage Area was established in 2019. It is administered by the Washington Trust for Historic Preservation.
