= Northern Plains National Heritage Area =

United States National Heritage Area in North Dakota

Northern Plains National Heritage Area is a federally designated National Heritage Area along an 80-mile (130 km) length of the Missouri River in central North Dakota. The heritage area promotes and interprets the scenic, cultural and historic heritage of the region. It extends from Knife River Indian Villages National Historic Site to Huff Indian Village State Historic Site The area interprets the history of the Three Affiliated Tribes, the passage of the Lewis and Clark Expedition, the fur trade, steamboats on the Missouri and Fort Abraham Lincoln. It also interprets the area's association with the Northern Pacific Railroad, as well as the area's heritage in agriculture and energy production.

The Northern Plains National Heritage Area comprises portions of Burleigh, Morton, Mercer, McLean and Oliver counties.

Northern Plains National Heritage Area was established by the Omnibus Public Land Management Act of 2009.

== Heritage sites ==
The Heritage Area includes the following sites:

- Audubon National Wildlife Refuge
- Bismarck-Deadwood Stage Trail Historic Marker
- Camp Hancock State Historic Site
- Chief Looking's Village
- Cross Ranch State Park
- Double Ditch State Historic Site
- Former Governors’ Mansion State Historic Site
- Fort Abraham Lincoln State Park
- Fort Rice
- Fort Sauerkraut
- Fort Stevenson State Park
- Huff Indian Village State Historic Site
- Knife River Indian Villages National Historic Site
- Lake Sakakawea State Park
- Long Lake National Wildlife Refuge
- North Dakota Heritage Center
- North Dakota State Railroad Museum
- Salem Sue
