= Paul M. Grist State Park =

State park in Dallas County, Alabama, United States

- Location within Alabama
- Location: Dallas County, Alabama, United States
- Coordinates: 32°36′04″N 86°59′19″W
- Area: 1,080 acres (440 ha)
- Elevation: 259 ft (79 m)
- Established: 1930s
- Administrator: Dallas County
- Website: Official website

Paul M. Grist State Park is a public recreation area located 17 miles (27 km) north of Selma operated by the government of Dallas County, Alabama. The park offers water activities on a 100-acre (40 ha) lake as well as facilities for camping and picnicking.

== History ==
The park was developed by workers in the Civilian Conservation Corps who built roads, trails, and the lake dam in the 1930s. It was first called Valley Creek State Park before being renamed for YMCA director and community leader Paul Malone Grist.

In 2015, the park was one of several state parks that were closed or saw curtailment of services following budget cuts. After a two-month hiatus, it reopened when an agreement was reached allowing Dallas County to lease the park from the state for 15 years at a cost of ten dollars.

== Activities and amenities ==
- Fishing: The park's 100-acre (40 ha) lake is stocked with bass, bluegill, redear sunfish and catfish. Only electric trolling motors are permitted. Boat rentals are offered and a boat launch is available for privately owned craft.
- Camping: The park's campground has 11 modern sites with hookups for RVs as well as primitive campsites.
- Day-use area: The park has picnic tables, a large picnic pavilion, a swimming beach, paddle boat rentals, playing fields, and shoreline fishing.
