= First Baptist Church (Selma, Alabama) =

Historic church in Alabama, United States

- U.S. National Register of Historic Places
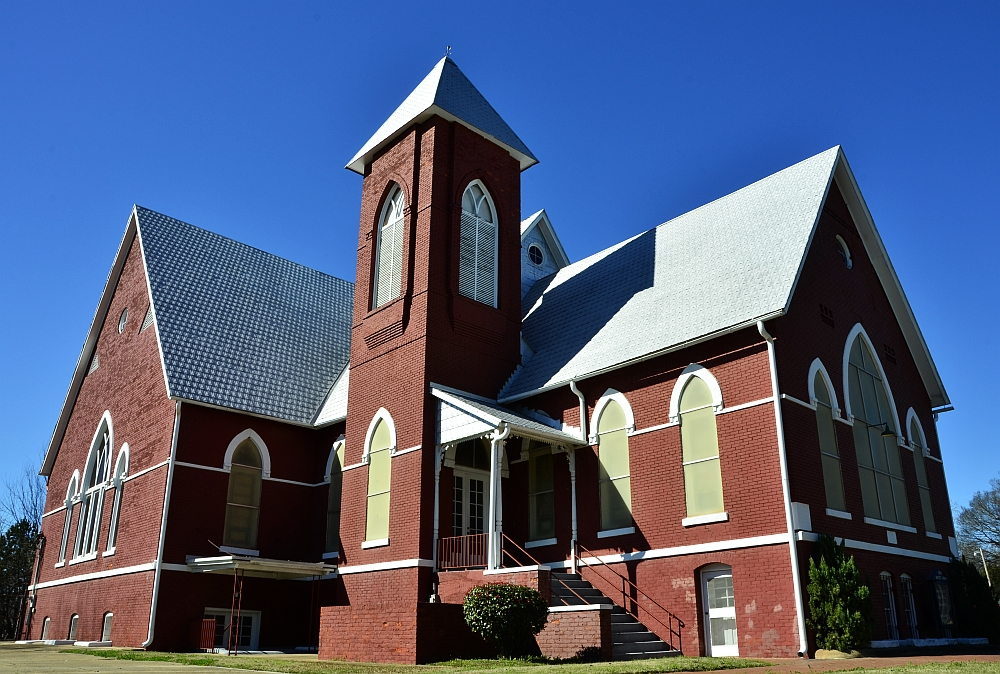
- First Baptist Church of Selma in 2013

- Location within Alabama Location within the United States
- Location: 709 Martin Luther King, Jr. St., Selma, Alabama
- Coordinates: 32°24′51″N 87°1′4″W
- Area: less than one acre
- Built: 1894
- Architect: Dave Benjamin West
- NRHP reference No.: 79000383
- Added to NRHP: September 20, 1979

First Baptist Church is a historic church at 709 Martin Luther King, Jr. Street in Selma, Alabama, United States. A historically African American Baptist church, it was built in the Gothic Revival style in 1894 and known for its association with the Civil Rights Movement. It was added to the National Register of Historic Places in 1979.

From the National Register of Historic Places Inventory — Nomination Form:

In 1963 under the leadership of Reverend M. C. Cleveland, the church became the first in the city to open its doors for activities and meetings of the Dallas County Voters League. During the next two years, the church was a focal point of the mass meeting and non-violent teaching sessions sponsored by the Student Nonviolent Coordinating Committee, and in late 1964, meetings were held in the church to plan the mass rallies and demonstrations of early 1965 which culminated in the Selma-to-Montgomery march. During the early months of 1965, Martin Luther King, Jr., Ralph Abernathy, and other leaders of the Southern Christian Leadership Conference, headquartered in Brown's Chapel half a block away, spoke nightly to the youth gathered at First Baptist Church. After the march, the church continued to headquarter the Student Nonviolent Coordinating Committee and continued to serve as a distribution center for food and clothing for those persons who suffered the loss of jobs.
