= Path of Progress National Heritage Tour Route =

United States National Heritage Area in Pennsylvania

The Path of Progress National Heritage Tour Route is a federally designated National Heritage Area, arranged as an automobile tour route through nine counties in southwestern Pennsylvania. The complete route is 500 miles (800 km) long.
