= Cache la Poudre River Corridor National Heritage Area =

Heritage area in Colorado, United States

Coordinates: 40°30′N 104°58′W

The Cache La Poudre River Corridor National Heritage Area extends along the flood plain of the Cache La Poudre River in Colorado, US. It is a federally designated National Heritage Area, extending for 45 miles (72 km) from Larimer County in the west where the river emerges from the Rocky Mountains, and ends near Greeley, Colorado, just before its confluence with the South Platte River. The designation provides a framework for the promotion and interpretation of the area's cultural and historic character, and the preservation of the natural and built environment, and is administered by the Poudre Heritage Alliance.

Significant historic and cultural resources include the Greeley No. 3 Ditch and the Bellvue Hydrological Laboratory, which were instrumental in the development of a means to deliver regulated irrigation water to farms and towns in the western United States.
