= Let's Move! =

Public health campaign in the United States

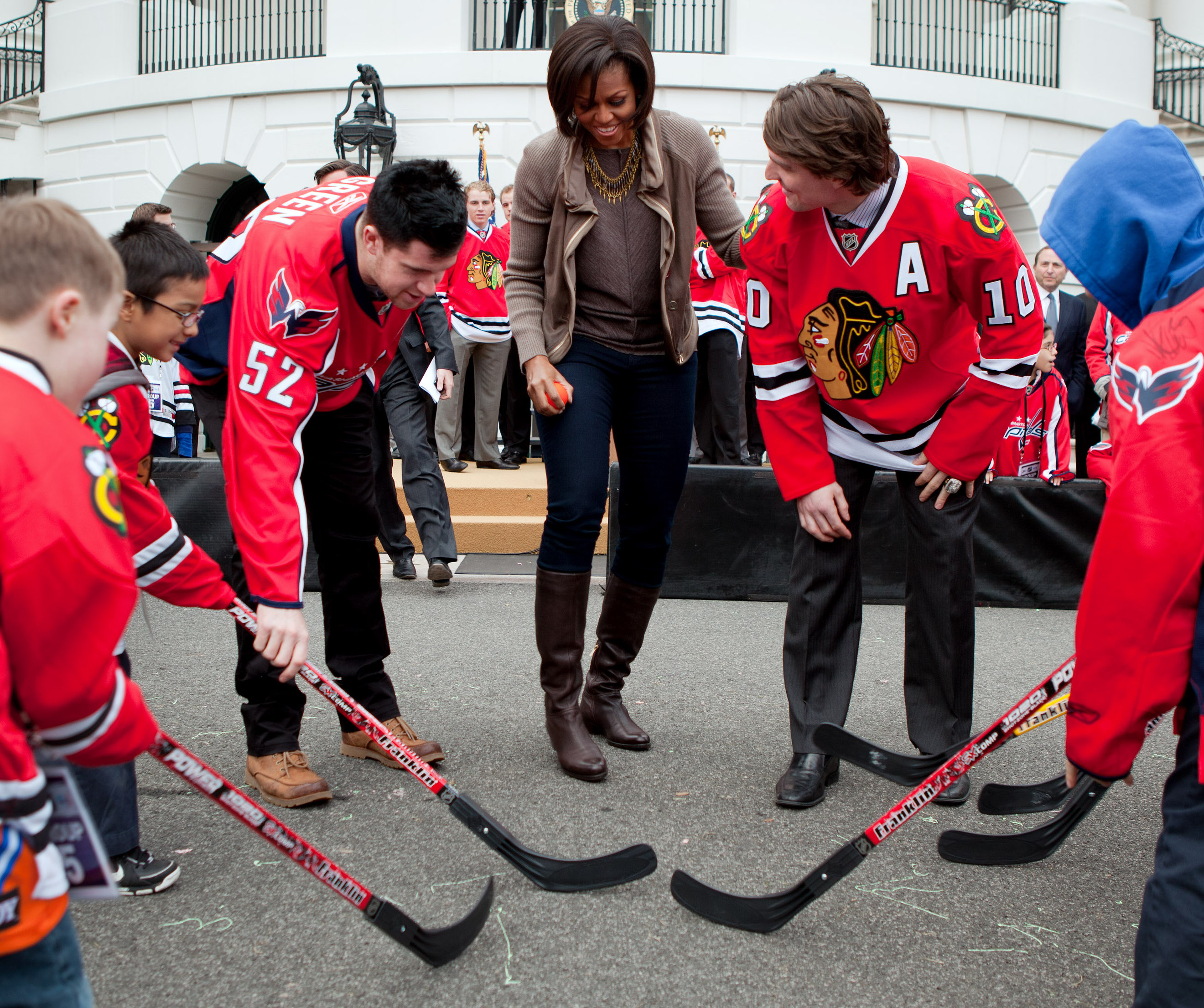
First Lady Michelle Obama participates in a Let's Move! and NHL partnership event in March 2011 alongside National Hockey League players Mike Green (left) and Patrick Sharp (right).

Let's Move! was a public health campaign in the United States led by First Lady Michelle Obama. The campaign aimed to reduce childhood obesity and encourage a healthy lifestyle in children.

The Let's Move! initiative had an initially stated goal of "solving the challenge of childhood obesity within a generation so that children born today will reach adulthood at a healthy weight". Let's Move! sought to decrease childhood obesity to 5% by 2030.

== History ==
The campaign was announced on February 9, 2010, by Michelle Obama. One major component of the campaign, the Hunger-Free Kids Act, was funded with money from the Supplemental Nutrition Assistance Program (food stamps). Obama indicated the campaign would encourage healthier food in schools, better food labeling and more physical activity for children. On the same date, Obama signed a presidential memorandum creating the Task Force on Childhood Obesity to review current programs and develop a national action plan. The Task Force reviews policy and programs related to child nutrition and physical activity. It hopes to create change through a national action plan with five goals:

- Creating a healthy start for children
- Empowering parents and caregivers
- Providing healthy food in schools
- Improving access to healthy, affordable foods
- Increasing physical activity

The White House Task Force hoped to bring the childhood obesity rate down to five percent by 2030.

In 2011, a song, "Move Your Body", was released to promote the campaign called "Let's Move! Flash Workout". The song was by Beyoncé featuring Swizz Beatz, and the video was filmed in a school cafeteria where Beyoncé was dancing with children.

The initiative was led for several years by Sam Kass, the personal chef to the Obamas who became the first-ever White House Senior Policy Advisor on Nutrition. He was succeeded in 2015 as both executive director of Let's Move! and Senior Policy Advisor on Nutrition by Debra Eschmeyer, a cofounder of FoodCorps.

Since the Let's Move! initiative was a collaboration of many government agencies and private entities, it lacked full-time employees. Department heads, business executives, volunteers, teachers, legislators, and others carry out the mission and goals of Let's Move! in conjunction with their primary work obligations. Michelle Obama is the chief spokeswoman and promoter, but she does not have staff solely dedicated to carrying out the Let's Move! initiative.

The campaign ended in January 2017 following the end of the Obama administration.

== Childhood obesity ==
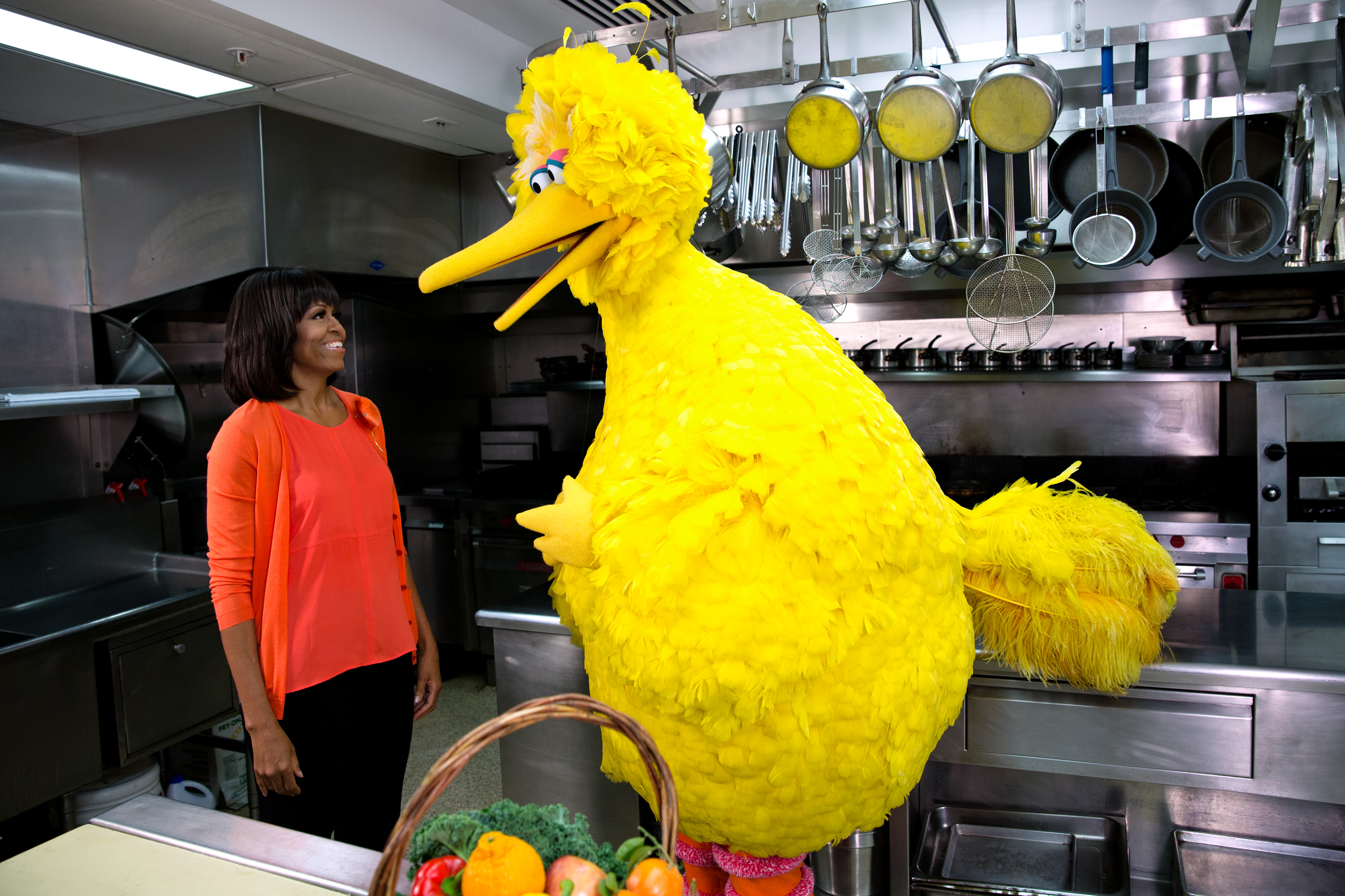
Obama participates in a Let's Move! and Sesame Street public service announcement taping with Big Bird in the White House Kitchen, 2013.

Body mass index (BMI) is a measurement of weight in relation to height that can help to determine weight status. In children, the Centers for Disease Control and Prevention (CDC) determines that a child is overweight if they are above the 85th percentile and lower than the 95th percentile and obese if at or above the 95th percentile.

The CDC indicates that there are several factors that can contribute to childhood obesity: genetic factors; behavioral factors including energy intake, physical activity and sedentary behavior; and environmental factors. Overweight and obesity pose many potential risks and consequences: psychological; cardiovascular disease; among additional risks including asthma, hepatic steatosis, sleep apnea, and type 2 diabetes. Today nearly one in five children in the U.S. between ages 6–19 are obese, and one in three are overweight. The childhood obesity rate tripled from 1980 to 1999 creating an epidemic and a generation where children may have shorter life spans than their parents.

The Let's Move! initiative focuses on the reform of behavioral factors and environmental factors by focusing on active lifestyles and healthy eating through community involvement, including but not limited to schools, parents, work places, and healthcare providers.

== Nutrition ==
To promote healthy eating, the Let's Move! initiative emphasizes nutrition information, a next generation food "icon", food nutrition labeling and having pediatricians as partners. The United States Department of Agriculture (USDA) presents its Let's Move food choice guidelines on the webpage called MyPlate, located at ChooseMyPlate.gov. Guidelines take the form of "half all grains eaten should be whole grains" and 37 nutrition tips. Let's Move! also provides consumers with nutrition information through the U.S. Food and Drug Administration (or FDA)'s "New Front-of-Package Labeling Initiative" and "New Menu and Vending Machines Labeling Requirements".

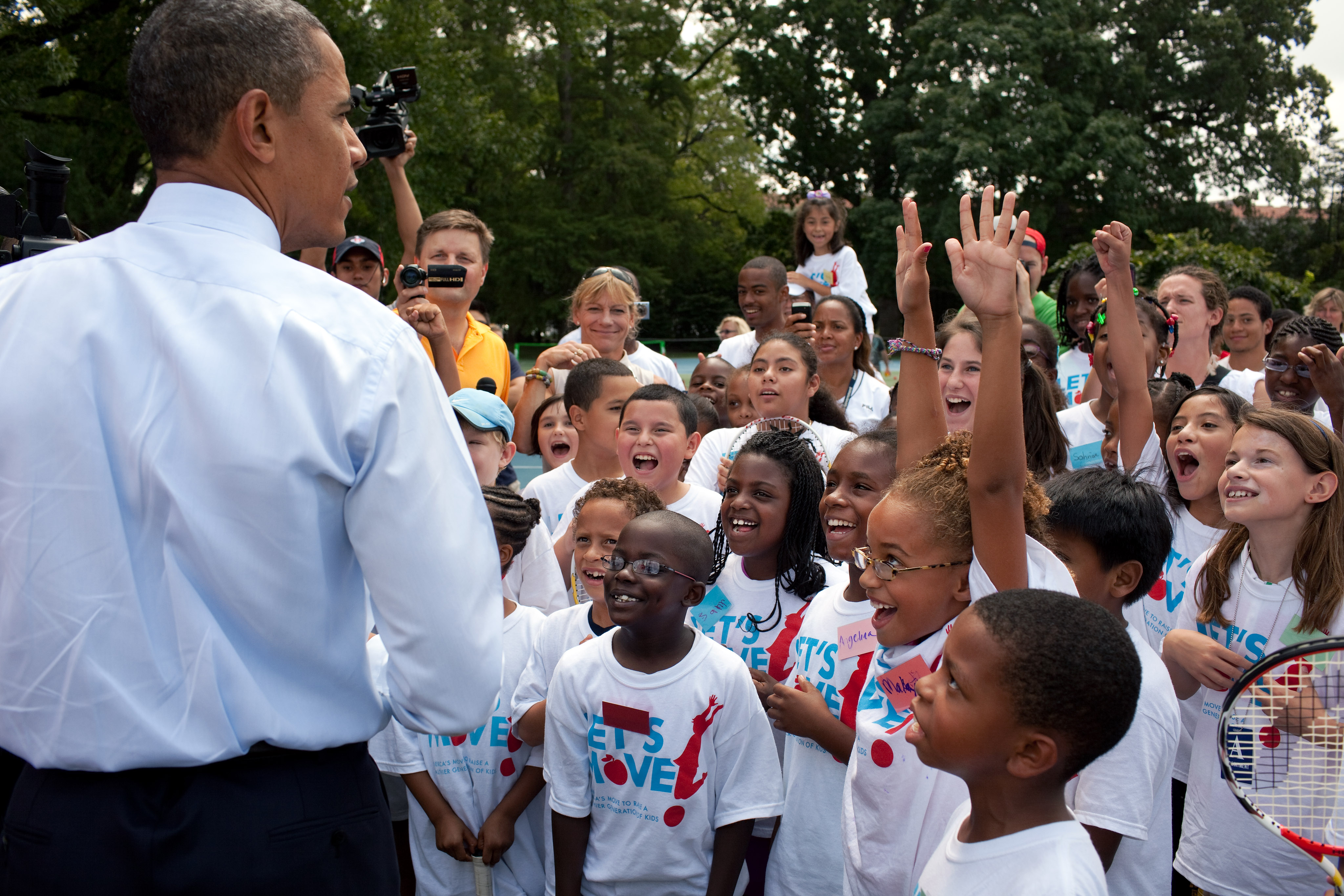
President Barack Obama meets with children from a Let's Move! tennis clinic on the South Lawn of the White House.

Let's Move! advocates healthy eating habits to be promoted by families, schools, and communities. Let's Move! urges mothers to eat more healthily when pregnant and offers links to a special "MyPyramid Plan for Moms" so they can create a personalized and healthy diet. The initiative also provides guidelines for parents to set up and promote healthy eating habits for their entire family and children. In order for healthier eating to be promoted at schools, Let's Move! promotes the USDA's HealthierUS School Challenge.

The HealthierUS School Challenge (HUSSC) is a voluntary initiative established in 2004 to recognize those schools participating in the National School Lunch Program that have created healthier school environments through promotion of nutrition and physical activity. In February 2010, First Lady Michelle Obama introduced Let's Move!, incorporating the HealthierUS School Challenge into her campaign to raise a healthier generation of kids. At the time, monetary incentive awards became available for each HUSSC award level: Bronze, Silver, Gold, and Gold Award of Distinction.

Random House publishers has said Michelle Obama will be writing a book on her White House garden, and her family's favorite healthy cooking ideas.

== Community involvement ==
For Let's Move to work effectively, communities would need to be involved, schools would need to implement health programs, and parents would need to teach their children healthy habits. The following sections describe how organizations and businesses had gotten involved in this nationwide movement.

=== Chefs Move to Schools ===
Chefs Move to Schools was founded in May 2010 as part of First Lady Michelle Obama's Let's Move campaign. The Chefs Move to Schools program is a nationwide effort to teach culinary skills to school children and to get them to try new, healthful food options. Professional chefs volunteer a specified amount of their time to cook with students and/or to help train school workers in how to prepare and provide food in a healthier manner. As of February 2, 2012 about 3,500 schools were partnered with professional chefs in an effort to educate students about a healthier diet in an entertaining and appealing way.

The program is also figure headed by Chef Sam Kass, an assistant chef at the White House and the Senior Policy Advisor for Healthy Food Initiatives. Food Network star Rachael Ray also publicly supports the program and has encouraged children to be involved in the kitchen on episodes of her show Rachael Ray. Other partners of the program include the School Nutrition Association, the American Culinary Federation, Cooking Matters, the United States Department of Agriculture, the Culinary Trust, the Partnership for a Healthier America, Cornell University, Philip Lempert the Supermarket Guru, the Harvard School of Public Health, the International Corporate Chefs Association, and the Food Service Management Institute.

Chefs can sign up to participate in the program on the website on the official Chefs Move to Schools website to be matched with a school in their area. They can select any or all of what they are interested in: helping to plant a school garden, teaching children about healthier living in the classroom, helping officials to develop school lunch menu items, and training students about culinary skills in the kitchen. On the application, chefs are also asked to provide information about their qualifications and training. Chefs are asked to specify how many hours they can devote to the program and which days of the week they can volunteer. These profiles are matched with other profiles that are created by schools to become an official partnership. Once the partnership is created, Chefs Move to Schools provides schools and chefs with resources to help them get started and to help guide both parties through a successful process.

=== Business involvement ===
Private businesses have also decided to make changes to improve healthy habits for kids. For example, Disney now requires that all foods sold and advertised have to follow nutritional guidelines of increasing fruit and vegetable consumption while decreasing calorie count. Also, Walgreens, Superval, and Walmart have announced building or expanding stores in areas that have limited access to healthy foods.

== Physical activity ==
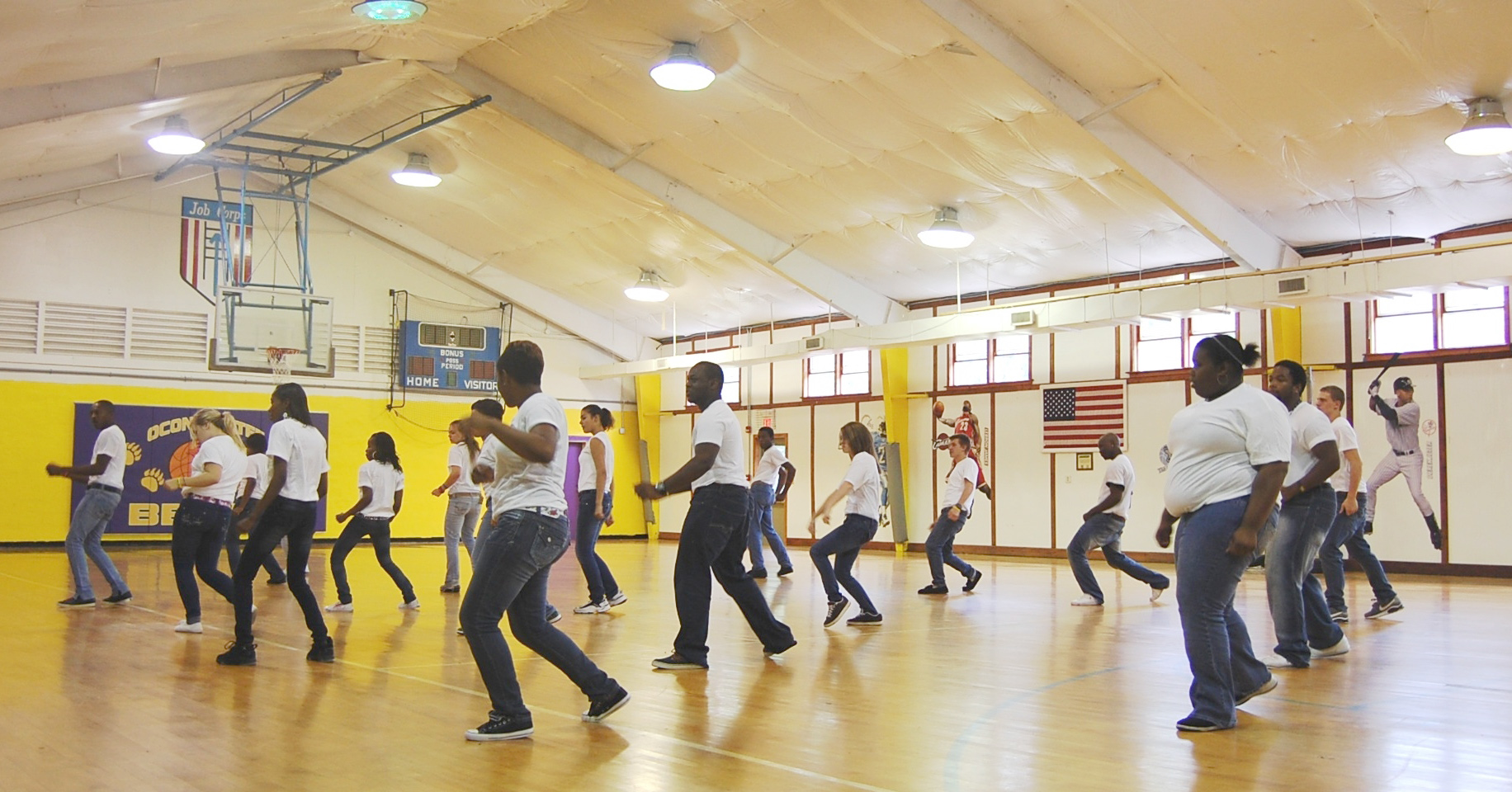
Students at the Oconaluftee Job Corps Civilian Conservation Center in Cherokee practice their choreography for a new student-produced fitness video.

The CDC recommends that children engage in one hour or more of physical activity every day. It states that children should do three different types of activity: aerobic activity, muscle strengthening, and bone strengthening.

Let's Move! looks to promote physical activity through the support and cooperation of families, schools, and communities. On children, the initiative states, "Those who feel supported by friends and families or are surrounded by others interested in physical activity, are more likely to participate." Let's Move! also provides several guidelines for schools to promote physical activity, including strong physical education programs, and indicates the subsidizing of such guidelines with several government programs. Guidelines by which physical activity can be promoted in communities are also outlined on the Let's Move! website.

== Impact evaluation ==
By 2015, childhood obesity rates had not changed much since 2008 but had dropped significantly among the youngest children.

== Collaboration ==
Let's Move faces a challenge: effective coordination between all involved agencies, companies, non-profits, and levels of government. Dr. Susanna Campbell, an international relations scholar, and Michael Harnett, an international business professional, conducted research and discussed the barriers to coordination, the main concepts of coordination, and recommendations for improving coordination. Rodrigo Serrano also provides insight into creating incentive programs to promote coordination.

Organizations are sovereign and the individuals within are accountable first to their organization and second to the coordination effort. Conflicts can arise when the goals of the coordination process don't align well with an agency's main goals. If there is a pressing problem to solve, it acts as its own incentive for coordination as long as the problem involves a possibility to find a coordinated solution. Of all the incentive programs proposed, an incentive system involving recognition may be the most effective and efficient. Agencies and organizations associated with Let's Move could receive an award as a result of making a positive impact according to Let's Move's goals and mission. Organizations could report their impact to the Task Force, and Michelle Obama could recognize the organizations that engaged the most and had the greatest impact. The award would also help remind organizations of the importance of working together to solve the problem of childhood obesity.

Let's Move could also improve its coordination process by establishing clear field officers in each associated organization and have them report to a central authority figure, like the Task Force on Childhood Obesity. The improved coordination process would make sure each organization or agency is accountable and that there isn't overlap or redundancy

== Impact ==
- 597 museums and gardens in all 50 states signed up to offer active exhibits and healthy food choices as part of Let's Move! Museums and Gardens.
- The Department of Defense updated their nutritional standards to include more fresh fruits, vegetables, whole grains, lean meats, and low-fat dairy products with every meal for troops.
- Walmart lowered the cost of fruits, vegetables, and whole grain products by $1 billion in 2011. They also promised to work with manufacturers to eliminate trans fats and remove 10% of the sugar and 25% of the sodium in the food they sell by 2015.
- Birds Eye committed to spending at least $2 million per year for three years to marketing and advertising efforts designed to encourage children to consume and enjoy vegetables, including 50 million coupons to promote vegetables.
- The First Lady worked with the US Tennis Association to build or refurbish more than 6,200 kid-sized tennis courts across the country, sign up more than 250,000 kids to complete their PALAs, and train 12,000 coaches to help kids learn tennis.
- The Blue Cross Blue Shield Association funded street-closings, called "Play Streets," to create a safe place for children and families to run, walk, bike, or play outside freely without traffic. In 2013, at least four Play Streets per city/town in 10 cities/towns across the country will be funded.
- The President's Council on Fitness, Sports and Nutrition updated the President's Challenge Youth Fitness Test to reflect the latest science on kids' health and promote active, healthy lifestyles rather than athletic performance and competition. The new Presidential Youth Fitness Program is a voluntary, school-based program that assesses students' fitness-based health and helps them progress over time. The new program will be implemented in 25 percent of US schools by the end of 2013, and 90 percent of US schools by 2018.
- The Partnership for a Healthier America teamed up with 157 hospitals to deliver more healthy options to patients and on-site cafeterias.
- Through the HealthierUS School Challenge, more than 5,000 schools now meet high standards in nutrition and fitness.
- Walgreens, Supervalu, Walmart and several regional grocers announced a commitment to build or expand 1,500 stores in communities with limited or no access to healthy food. This initiative will provide access to fresh food to an estimated 9.5 million people who currently have limited access. In California alone, the Fresh Works Fund has committed 200 million dollars to this effort to increase access to healthy food.
- The First Lady launched MyPlate and MiPlato, an easy to understand icon to help parents make healthier choices for their families. More than 6,100 community groups and 100 national organizations and corporations have partnered with the USDA to give families across the country access to this important nutritional information.

The 2020 edition of Siena College Research Institute's First Ladies Survey included a supplementary question asking historians and scholars to assess the effectiveness of signature initiatives of the ten first ladies between 1964 and 2020. Let's Move! ranked was 2nd in effectiveness, behind only Lady Bird Johnson's efforts promoting environmental protection and beautification.

== Let's Move! Flash Workout ==
Let's Move! Flash Workout is a 2011 initiative by R&B singer Beyoncé in collaboration with Michelle Obama, and the National Association of Broadcasters Education Foundation to help boost her campaign against child obesity.

Beyoncé reworked the 2007 hit "Get Me Bodied" and changed the title to "Move Your Body" for the Let's Move! Flash Workout initiative. A Spanish version was also created. The lyrics were switched to fit the cause.

The new lyrics include the line: "Don't just stand there on the wall, everybody just move your body, move your body, move your body." The song is a step-by-step flash dance-style workout that combines hip hop, Latin and dancehall moves with traditional exercise. On April 9, 2011, an instructional video featuring a group of teenagers dancing to "Move Your Body" was released online. After a few days, Beyoncé has said that she "would record her own version of the exercise routine" to show kids how it is done by shooting a new music video featuring a series of fun workouts to accompany the track. On April 26, 2011, Beyoncé released a video of her own version of the exercise routine. Concerning the campaign, Beyoncé expressed:

I am excited to be part of this effort that addresses a public health crisis. First Lady Michelle Obama deserves credit for tackling this issue directly, and I applaud the NAB Education Foundation for trying to make a positive difference in the lives of our schoolchildren.

=== "Move Your Body" ===
Beyoncé reworked her original "Get Me Bodied" (2007) into what has been described as a "kid-friendlier" track titled "Move Your Body" in 2011. Choreography was created by Frank Gatson, who additionally created the choreography for "Single Ladies".

On April 9, 2011, an instructional video featuring a group of teenagers dancing to "Move Your Body" was released online. After a few days, Beyoncé explained that she "would record her own version of the exercise routine" to show kids how it is done by shooting a new music video featuring a series of fun workouts to accompany the track. On April 26, 2011, Beyoncé released a video directed by Melina Matsoukas for "Move Your Body". In the video, students join Beyoncé to perform choreography by Frank Gatson. In the choreography, Beyoncé and the students "mix salsa, dancehall, and the running man." The music video for "Move Your Body" takes place as a four-minute long flash mob. The video begins during lunch hour at what looks like a junior high cafeteria. Everything is status quo until Beyoncé, wearing short shorts and green knee-high socks, enters the cafeteria doors to begin the song. After Beyoncé's entry, all the kids jump to their feet, following along as Beyoncé leads the group through all kinds of dances.

The instructional video was distributed to participating schools across the country on May 3, 2011, during a 'dance-in'. Beyoncé was at P.S. 161 middle school in Harlem on that particular date. She taught students the moves from her "Move Your Body" video. Beyoncé appeared in the gym much to the delight of her young fans, who danced alongside her and took photos. Lauretta Charlton of Black Entertainment Television (BET) gave the video a positive review stating that "It's impossible to watch without wanting to, well, move your body." Nicole James of MTV Buzzworthy showed great interest in the video and its message, stating that Beyoncé gets kids heart pumping, "in more ways than one". Genevieve Koski of The A.V. Club added that "if anything can help curb the nation's childhood obesity problem, it is the galvanizing power of Beyoncé Knowles dancing", and further praised how "[the] bunch of cute kids [were] doing the Running Man and The Dougie in the cafeteria with Beyoncé." "Move Your Body" was planned to be featured on the 2012 dance-rhythm video game Just Dance 4, but was scrapped for unknown reasons.

== See also ==
- American Grown: The Story of the White House Kitchen Garden and Gardens Across America
- Every Kid in a Park
- Healthy, Hunger-Free Kids Act of 2010
- Songs for a Healthier America (2013)
- White House Kitchen Garden
- Partnership for a Healthier America
