= Lempert =

Lempert is a surname. Notable people with the surname include:

- Jochen Lempert (born 1958), German photographer
- László Lempert (born 1952), Hungarian-American mathematician
- Phil Lempert (born 1953), American television personality
- Ted Lempert (born 1961), American politician
- Werner Lempert (1937–2025), East German slalom canoeist
