= Olajide Williams (scientist) =

American neurologist

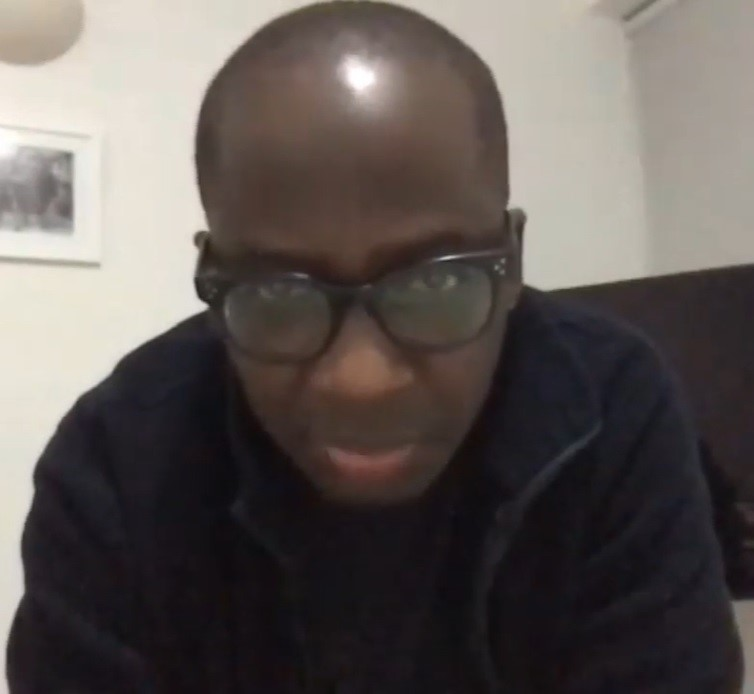
- Olajide Williams in 2020
- Born: 1969 (age 56–57)
- Education: University of Lagos; Columbia University Irving Medical Center
- Scientific career
- Workplaces: Columbia University

Olajide Williams (born 1969) is an American neurologist and the founder of Hip-Hop Public Health. He is Chief of Staff and Professor of Neurology at Columbia University.

== Early life and education ==
Williams was born prematurely into the front seat of his mother's Volkswagen beetle, and spent most of the first year of his life in hospital. As a teenager, Williams attended Haileybury College in the United Kingdom. Williams trained in medicine in the University of Lagos. It was in Lagos that he first became interested in public health, recognising how many people were dying from preventable diseases. In an interview with the American Heart Association, Williams said that he felt "too African in England, and too English in Africa", so instead moved to the United States. He completed his specialist training in neurology at the Columbia University Irving Medical Center. It was whilst working at the Harlem Hospital Center that he recognised the same public health disconnect that he had seen in Lagos related to societal inequities. He subsequently earned a Master's of Public Health in 2004.

== Research and career ==
After earning his graduate degree, Williams started working with the National Stroke Association (NSA) and community groups in Harlem with whom he looked to establish trusted, evidence-based public health awareness programmes. With the support from the NSA, Williams researched the effectiveness of teaching children about neurological conditions through hip hop music. Whilst working at the Harlem Hospital Center Williams established the Stroke Center of Excellence.

Williams founded the Hip Hop Stroke programme, a National Institutes of Health funded initiative which developed a school-based stroke education programme to teach children about stroke. The school programme reached 12,000 children. In 2006, Williams and hip hop pioneer Doug E. Fresh launched Hip-Hop Public Health, a non-profit organisation that looks to educate people about public health issues through the lens of public health. Hip-Hop Public Health was offered to schools and hospitals around New York state. As part of this work, Williams devised videos, cartoons and a novel stroke video game to teach school students from minority backgrounds about the risks of stroke. After the training sessions, 60% of the children had perfect scores in a stroke perception test. Williams also was the executive producer of Songs for a Healthier America, an album that aimed to amplify the benefits of healthier child nutritional and exercise choices. Alongside his academic research, Williams looks to develop medical education programmes to promote equity and inclusion in academic medicine.

During the COVID-19 pandemic Williams joined Doug E. Fresh to create a series of videos to encourage young people to wash their hands for twenty seconds or more.

== Awards and honours ==
Williams has won several awards for his research and advocacy. In 2008 he was awarded the NAACP Community Service Award. He was selected by The Root as one of the United States' most influential African-Americans in 2012. That same year he was recognized by Fast Company Magazine as the 65th most creative person in business. He was awarded the European Stroke Research Foundation Investigator award in 2017 in Berlin. In 2018 he was honoured by the American Heart Association's Northeast Cerebrovascular Consortium for his work on stroke disparities in underserved communities.

== Selected publications ==
- Williams, Olajide. (2010). Stroke diaries : a guide for survivors and their families. New York: Oxford University Press. ISBN 978-0-19-974548-7. OCLC 610218547.
- Williams, O.; Teresi, J.; Eimicke, J. P.; Abel-Bey, A.; Hassankhani, M.; Valdez, L.; Chan, L. G.; Kong, J.; Ramirez, M.; Ravenell, J.; Ogedegbe, G. (2019). "Effect of Stroke Education Pamphlets vs a 12-Minute Culturally Tailored Stroke Film on Stroke Preparedness Among Black and Hispanic Churchgoers: A Cluster Randomized Clinical Trial". JAMA Neurology. 76 (10): 1211–1218. doi:10.1001/jamaneurol.2019.1741. PMC 6802046. PMID 31260028.
- Williams, O.; Swierad, E. A. (2019). "A Multisensory Multilevel Health Education Model for Diverse Communities". International Journal of Environmental Research and Public Health. 16 (5): 872. doi:10.3390/ijerph16050872. PMC 6427730. PMID 30857345.
- Williams, O.; Leighton-Hermann Quinn, E.; Teresi, J.; Eimicke, J. P.; Kong, J.; Ogedegbe, G.; Noble, J. (2018). "Improving Community Stroke Preparedness in the HHS (Hip-Hop Stroke) Randomized Clinical Trial". Stroke. 49 (4): 972–979. doi:10.1161/STROKEAHA.117.019861. PMC 5871596. PMID 29567762.
- Williams, Olajide; DeSorbo, Alexandra; Noble, James; Gerin, William (2012). "Child-Mediated Stroke Communication". Stroke. 43 (1): 163–169. doi:10.1161/strokeaha.111.621029. ISSN 0039-2499. PMC 3246577. PMID 22033995.
- Williams, Olajide; Leighton-Herrmann Quinn, Ellyn; Ramirez, Mildred; Sawyer, Vanessa; Eimicke, Joseph; Teresi, Jeanne (2017). "Development of a Menu Board Literacy and Self-efficacy Scale for Children". Journal of Nutrition Education and Behavior. 49 (10): 867–871. doi:10.1016/j.jneb.2017.07.008. PMID 29128031. S2CID 19061418.
