= Great American Outdoors Act =

United States conservation law of 2020

- Long title: An Act to amend title 54, United States Code, to establish, fund, and provide for the use of amounts in a National Parks and Public Land Legacy Restoration Fund to address the maintenance backlog of the National Park Service, the United States Fish and Wildlife Service, the Bureau of Land Management, the Forest Service, and the Bureau of Indian Education, and to provide permanent, dedicated funding for the Land and Water Conservation Fund, and for other purposes.
- Enacted by: the 116th United States Congress

Citations
- Public law: Pub. L. 116–152 (text) (PDF)

Legislative history
- Introduced in the House as H.R. 1957 (Taxpayer First Act of 2019) by John Lewis (D–GA) on March 28, 2019; Committee consideration by House Committee on Ways and Means; passed committee on April 9, 2019 House Financial Services Committee; committee discharged on April 9, 2019; Passed the House on April 9, 2019 (voice vote); Passed the Senate as the Great American Outdoors Act on June 17, 2020 (73–25); Signed into law by President Donald Trump on August 4, 2020

The Great American Outdoors Act (H.R. 1957) is a piece of legislation passed by the United States Congress, signed by then-President Donald Trump, and activated into Public Law (Public Law No. 116-152) in 2020. It has two major components: fully and permanently fund the Land and Water Conservation Fund (LWCF) at $900 million per year, and providing $9.5 billion over five years ($1.9 billion annually) to address a maintenance backlog at American national parks, including updating facilities to increase accessibility for the general public. The Associated Press wrote that it would be "the most significant conservation legislation enacted in nearly half a century."

However, after the legislation was passed, the Trump administration's Executive Order 3388 was deemed to have weakened the effects of the GAOA. These rules and restrictions were reverted by the Biden administration on February 11, 2021.

== Background ==
Before the Great American Outdoors Act (GAOA), the LWCF received funding in the form of yearly allocations from the government generated by oil and gas leases, however, the amount allocated was not consistent from year to year. Additionally, the funding they received was shared with other programs, like the Cooperative Endangered Species Conservation Fund. The $900 million dedicated to the LWCF is shared between state and local governments, National Park Service (NPS), Bureau of Land Management (BLM), U.S. Fish & Wildlife Service (FWS), and the U.S. Forest Service (USFS). When the GAOA was enacted in 2020, the Department of the Interior Task Force, composed of members from the BLM, NPS, FWS, Bureau of Indian Affairs and other organizations established goals to ensure proper use of the funding. These goals are focused on supporting the public and employees when visiting and working in these natural spaces, as well as discovering new ways these places can be used in the future, like creating new jobs and reducing the effects of climate change.

The GAOA created the National Parks and Public Land Legacy Restoration Fund (NPPLLRF) to address the maintenance backlogs in the National Parks. The NPPLLRF receives up to $1.3 billion per year from 2021 until 2025, which adds up to $6.5 billion. In 2018, the NPS appraised the maintenance backlogs to be $11.9 billion, caused by wear and tear from a rapidly increasing number of visitors to the parks every year. The lack of resources and accessibility to the parks makes the maintenance required a demanding task.

== Legislative history ==
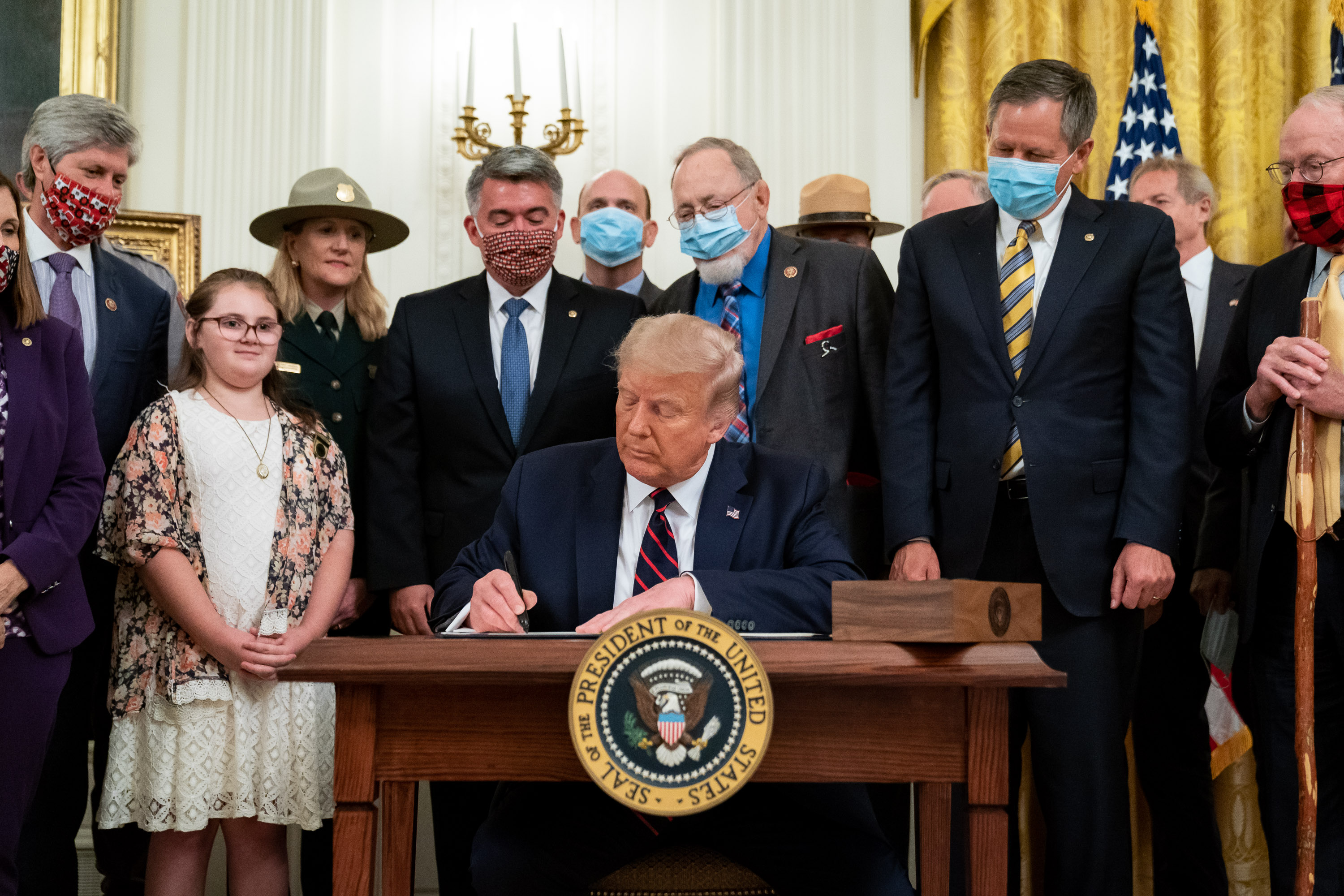
President Trump signs the Great American Outdoors Act, August 4, 2020.

The bill was first introduced in the House of Representatives by John Lewis (D-GA) as the Taxpayer First Act of 2019 on March 28, 2019. After inserting amendments, Senator Cory Gardner (R–CO) reintroduced the bill in the Senate on March 9, 2020, during the 116th United States Congress as the Great American Outdoors Act. On June 9, it passed a procedural vote 80–17 and moved to full consideration before the Senate.

The bill passed the Senate on June 17 by a vote of 73–25. On July 22, the amended bill was passed by the House on a bipartisan vote of 310–107. On the same day, Secretary of the Interior, David Bernhardt, announced, "I’ve designated August 4th as Great American Outdoors Day and waived entrance fees to celebrate the passage of this historic conservation law."

Even though Trump's administration signed and passed the GAOA, on November 9, 2020, Trump's Interior Secretary David Bernhardt implemented a rule which would give local authorities a veto over LWCF acquisitions, which critics said would significantly weaken the impact of the legislation. The Trump administration also proposed significantly fewer projects than the legislation called for. These rules and restrictions were reverted by the Biden administration on February 11, 2021.

== Support and opposition ==
Considered bipartisan in nature for the 116th Congress, the bill attracted 59 co-sponsors, both Democrats and Republicans. President Trump expressed a willingness to sign the act after being shown an impressive picture of land within Black Canyon of the Gunnison National Park protected by LWCF funds, despite previously opposing the LWCF. The LWCF, first established in 1965, had been made permanent by the 2019 John D. Dingell Jr. Conservation, Management, and Recreation Act but had not been permanently funded at that time. (Note: Prior to the indefinite re-authorization, the Land and Water Conservation Fund had been expired for a period of five months. It had been funded through temporary measures before eventually being discontinued in September 2018.)

The measure was supported by conservation organizations such as The Nature Conservancy, the National Wildlife Federation, and the League of Conservation Voters, while some animal husbandry and mining groups opposed it. The New York Times reported that some Democrats believed that Mitch McConnell, the Senate Majority Leader, only allowed debate on the bill in order to support the 2020 re-election efforts of Gardner and Steve Daines (R–MT).

== Effects ==
At the time of its implementation, the GAOA was meant to address the backlog of maintenance and allow parks to restore natural areas. As of April 2024, the funding has addressed $774.9M of deferred maintenance, completed 254 projects with another 377 in progress. These projects span across all 50 states, including the District of Columbia and various U.S. territories. The GAOA, through the LWCF, contributes to state and local assistance by funding programs such as the Urban Park and Recreation Recovery program and the Federal Land to Park Program. Since 2021 these projects have provided over seventeen thousand jobs and contributed a yearly average of $1.8 billion to local economies.

A few examples of completed projects are the Intermountain Region Restoration, Reviving Treasured Trails of Montana, and Repaired Big Four Ice Cave Bridge.
