= Santa Cruz Valley National Heritage Area =

Protected area in Santa Cruz County, Arizona

- Location within Arizona Location within the United States
- Location: Arizona, United States
- Coordinates: 31°31′29″N 110°38′3″W
- Established: 2019
- Governing body: Santa Cruz Valley Heritage Alliance, Inc.
- Website: santacruzheritage.org/

Santa Cruz Valley National Heritage Area is a federally designated National Heritage Area in south Arizona. The national heritage area covers 3,300 square miles of the watershed of the Santa Cruz River to protect and honor the areas natural environment, culture, and historic sites. It includes land in both Pima County and Santa Cruz County.

Plans for a National Heritage Area in the Santa Cruz watershed began in the early 2000s, and were first introduced to state legislature in 2007. The area was made official in 2019 after the passing of the John D. Dingell Jr. Conservation, Management, and Recreation Act. Santa Cruz Valley Heritage Alliance, Inc. is the non-profit entity that manages the programs and projects of the Santa Cruz Valley National Heritage Area.
