= Appalachian Forest National Heritage Area =

Coordinates: 38.69°N 79.72°W

The Appalachian Forest National Heritage Area (abbreviated to AFNHA) is a National Heritage Area encompassing 16 counties in West Virginia and 2 counties in Western Maryland.

In Maryland, AFNHA encompasses Allegany and Garrett Counties. In West Virginia, AFNHA encompasses Barbour, Braxton, Grant, Greenbrier, Hampshire, Hardy, Mineral, Morgan, Nicholas, Pendleton, Pocahontas, Preston, Randolph, Tucker, Upshur and Webster Counties.

It was designated a National Heritage Area in part of the Natural Resources Management Act in 2019.
