= Adams Memorial =

Proposed United States presidential memorial

The Adams Memorial is a proposed United States presidential memorial on the National Mall to honor Founding Father and second President John Adams and his legacy. The U.S. Congress has created the Adams Memorial Commission to oversee the planning and construction of the Memorial. Commissioner Jackie Gingrich Cushman serves as the Chairman of the Adams Memorial Commission.

== History ==
On November 5, 2001, the United States Congress enacted a bill for the establishment of a "commemorative work...to honor former President John Adams and his legacy." The Memorial is to honor both John Adams and the other members of the Adams Family renowned for public service: his wife and prolific writer Abigail Adams; their son, the sixth U.S. President John Quincy Adams; his wife Louisa Catherine Adams; their son, American Civil War diplomat, politician, and editor Charles Francis Adams, Sr.; and Charles' two sons, noted historian and autobiographer Henry Adams and academician Brooks Adams.

Congress authorized the Adams Memorial Foundation to be the sponsor responsible for the planning and construction of the Memorial. The Foundation was given permission to raise private funds to construct the Adams Memorial on federal land in Washington, D.C. Once established, the Memorial was to be turned over to the federal government. On December 2, 2002, Congress amended this legislation to permit the Adams Memorial to be constructed within Area 1, the central core of the District of Columbia centered on the National Mall.

The Commemorative Works Clarification and Revision Act of 2003 (CWCRA) gave the Adams Memorial Foundation seven years to raise funds and begin construction. With construction not yet begun, Congress passed legislation on October 30, 2009, extending the deadline to September 30, 2010. On May 24, 2010, Congress again extended the deadline to December 2, 2013.

Authorization for the Adams Memorial expired on December 2, 2013, without construction having begun. At a 2014 Senate hearing before the Subcommittee on National Parks, the Adams Memorial Foundation was praised for having worked diligently on the Memorial. Congress again reauthorized the Memorial on Dec. 19, 2014, extending the deadline to December 2, 2020. With construction still not begun, in March 2019 Congress established the Adams Memorial Commission in the John D. Dingell Jr. Conservation, Management, and Recreation Act to oversee the planning and construction of the Memorial.

== The Adams Memorial Commission ==
The Adams Memorial Commission is a Congressional commission that was directed to consist of 4 members of the House of Representatives, 4 Senators, and 4 civilians appointed by the President of the United States. The Memorial Commission is responsible for site selection, design, permitting, and construction of the Memorial.

In the fall of 2020, President Trump made two of four presidential appointments, Timothy Harleth and Jackie Gingrich Cushman, daughter of former U.S. House Speaker Newt Gingrich. In March 2023, President Biden made the remaining two presidential appointments, Major General Peter Cooke and Richard Houghton.

In December 2023, Speaker Mike Johnson appointed four members of the House of Representatives to serve on the commission: Rep. Morgan Griffith of Virginia, Rep. John Moolenaar of Michigan, Rep. Stephen Lynch of Massachusetts, and Rep. Gerry Connolly of Virginia.

The four Senatorial members of the commission were not appointed.

After the appointment of a majority of its members, the commission met several times. At its first meeting in January 2024, Commissioner Cushman was made chairman, and Commissioner Cooke was made Vice Chairman. The commission has since re-created the Adams Memorial Foundation, a 501(c)(3) non-profit corporation established to raise private funds and awareness for the Memorial. Commissioner Cushman serves as President of the Adams Memorial Foundation.

Pursuant to its authorizing statute, the commission was to produce an end-of-year report before the close of 2024.

The statute stated that commission would terminate on December 2, 2025. On December 9, 2025, the House of Representatives passed a bill that would extend authorization of the commission to 2032 and direct the memorial to be located at a site northeast of The Ellipse in President's Park or elsewhere in the Reserve; as of February 2026, the Senate has not taken action on the bill.

== See also ==
- List of national memorials of the United States
- Presidential memorials in the United States
- Memorial to the 56 Signers of the Declaration of Independence
