= Public Land Corps =

The Public Land Corps (PLC) is a work and education program for young people and veterans that is run by the United States land management agencies in association with state conservation and service corps. The objective is the rehabilitation and restoration of public land resources and infrastructure. The Public Land Corps was authorized by the National and Community Service Trust Act on May 27, 1993, H.R. 2328. The 21st Century Conservation Service Corps Act in 2019 allowed Public Land Corps to partner with more federal agencies on conservation and restoration projects and created the Indian Youth Service Corps within the Public Land Corps.

The state organizations recruit young Americans between ages 16 to 30, inclusive, to join the Public Land Corps. The Corps offers

- meaningful, full-time, productive work in a natural or cultural resource setting;
- a mix of work experience, basic and life skills, education, training and support services; and
- the opportunity to develop citizenship values and skills through service to their community and the United States.
- a period of non-competitive hiring status for 2 years from the completion of their most recent Corps service.

Participants repair or construct parks trails, removing invasive species, restore historic buildings, and conduct other projects.

Public Land Corps programs are eligible for AmeriCorps grants.

== Participating conservation and service corps ==
Nationwide

- Student Conservation Association
- American Conservation Experience

Alaska

- Serve Alaska Youth Corps

Arizona

- Coconino Rural Environment Corps
- Southwest Conservation Corps

California

- American Conservation Experience
- California Conservation Corps
- Conservation Corps North Bay
- Los Angeles Conservation Corps

Colorado

- Colorado Range Rider Youth Corps
- Southwest Conservation Corps
- Western Colorado Conservation Corps
- Mile High Youth Corps
- Rocky Mountain Youth Corps

Idaho

- Idaho Conservation Corps

Maine

- Maine Conservation Corps

Maryland

- Civic Works
- Appalachian Forest Heritage Area

Minnesota

- Minnesota Conservation Corps

Nevada

- Nevada Conservation Corps

New Mexico

- Rocky Mountain Youth Corps

North Carolina

- American Conservation Experience

Oregon

- Northwest Youth Corps

Texas

- American Conservation Experience
- Texas Conservation Corps at American YouthWorks

Utah

- American Conservation Experience
- Utah Conservation Corps

Vermont

- Vermont Youth Conservation Corps

Washington

- EarthCorps
- Washington Conservation Corps, Department of Ecology
- Washington Conservation Corps, Department of Natural Resources

West Virginia

- Citizens Conservation Corps of West Virginia
- Appalachian Forest Heritage Area
