= Land and Water Conservation Fund =

US program for natural areas protection

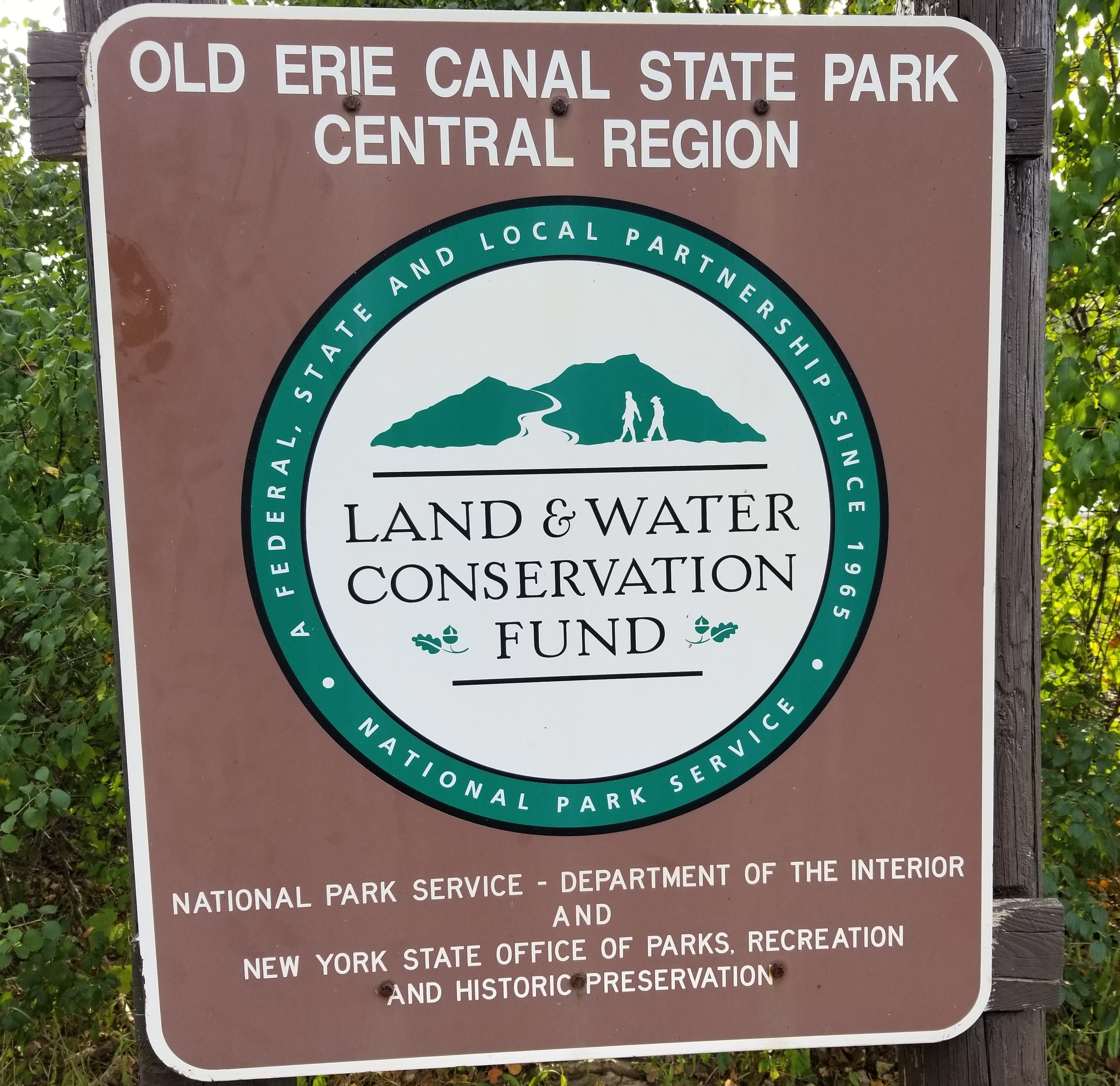
Land and Water Conservation Fund sign at the Old Erie Canal State Historic Park, DeWitt, New York

The United States' Land and Water Conservation Fund (LWCF) is a federal program that was established by Act of Congress in 1965 to provide funds and matching grants to federal, state and local governments for the acquisition of land and water, and easements on land and water, for the benefit of all Americans. The main emphases of the fund are recreation and the protection of national natural treasures in the forms of parks and protected forest and wildlife areas. The LWCF has a broad-based coalition of support and oversight, including the National Parks Conservation Association, Environment America, The Wilderness Society, the Land Trust Alliance, the Nature Conservancy, the National Wildlife Federation, and The Conservation Fund.

In August 2020, President Trump signed the Great American Outdoors Act into law, which requires that the LWCF be funded at $900 million yearly, a significant increase from previous funding levels.

== Funding ==
The primary source of income to the fund is fees and royalties paid to the Bureau of Ocean Energy Management, Regulation and Enforcement by oil and gas drilling offshore in federal water for oil and gas. Congress regularly diverts most of the funds from this source to other purposes, however. Additional minor sources of income include the sale of surplus federal real estate and taxes on motorboat fuel.

Funds from the Land and Water Conservation Fund have been utilized over the years on projects both large and small. LWCF has helped state agencies and local communities acquire nearly seven million acres (28,000 km^{2}) of land and easements controlling further land, developed project sites including such popular recreational areas as Harper's Ferry in West Virginia, California's Big Sur Coast, and the Greater Yellowstone Ecosystem in Montana, helped maintain Yellowstone National Park, and helped to build and maintain "thousands of local playgrounds, soccer fields, and baseball diamonds."

Though LWCF is authorized with a budget cap of $900 million annually, this cap has been met only twice during the program's nearly four decades of existence. As of 2015 the program generated about $2.5 million a day from leases on offshore oil and gas drilling.

The program is divided into two distinct funding pools: state grants and federal acquisition funds. The distribution formula takes into account population density and other factors.

On the federal side, each year, based on project demands from communities as well as input from the federal land management agencies, the President makes recommendations to Congress regarding funding for specific LWCF projects. In Congress, these projects go through an Appropriations Committee review process. Given the intense competition among projects, funding is generally only provided for those projects with universal support. Initially authorized for a twenty-five-year period, the LWCF has been extended for another twenty-five years, lasting until January 2015. In October 2015, describing it as a "slush fund", Rob Bishop of Utah, chairman of the House Natural Resources Committee, had blocked a vote on reauthorization.

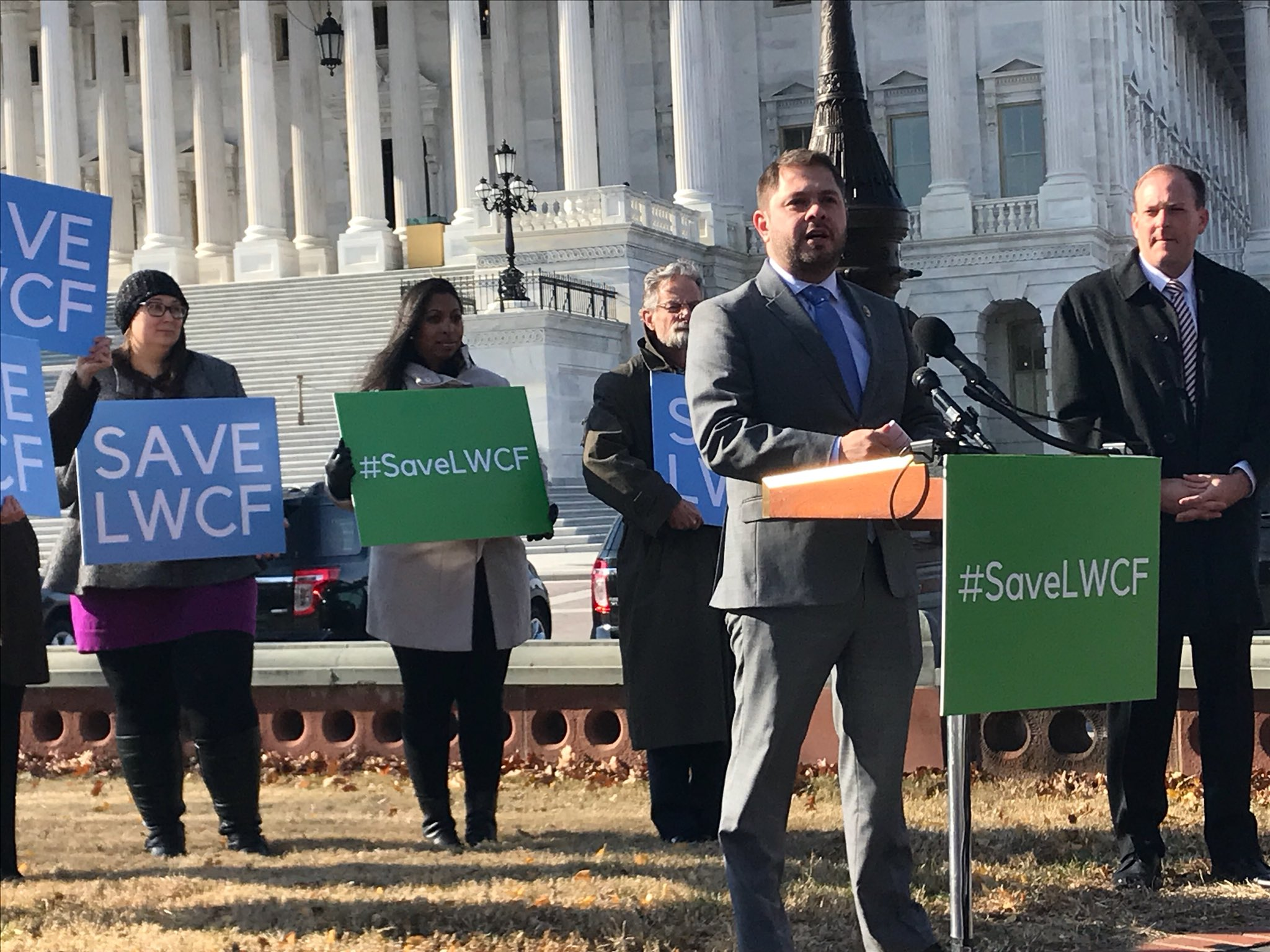
Congressman Ruben Gallego speaks in support of the LWCF in 2018.

The legal authorization of the LWCF expired on Sunday, September 30, 2018.

The Land and Water Conservation Fund was permanently reauthorized as part of the bipartisan John D. Dingell Jr. Conservation, Management, and Recreation Act, signed into law on March 12, 2019. It requires at least 40% of funds to be used by federal agencies and at least 40% to be allocated to the states. The Dingell Act, however, did not provide permanent funding for the LWCF, merely permanent authorization.

In 2020, the Great American Outdoors Act was introduced by Cory Gardner (R-CO) on March 9, 2020, during the 116th United States Congress. It would fully and permanently fund the LWCF. Considered unusually bipartisan in nature in the context of the 116th Congress, the bill attracted 59 co-sponsors, both Democrats and Republicans. On June 9, 2020, it passed a procedural vote 80-17 and moved to full consideration before the Senate. President Trump expressed a willingness to sign the act after being shown an impressive picture of land within Black Canyon of the Gunnison National Park protected by LWCF funds, despite previously opposing the LWCF. The Great American Outdoors Act was signed into law by President Donald J. Trump on August 4, 2020.
