= National Stroke Awareness Month =

Month-long recognition of strokes

National Stroke Awareness Month is observed in the United States annually during the month of May. National Stroke Awareness Month was created to promote public awareness and reduce the incidence of stroke in the United States.

== History ==
National Stroke Awareness Month began in May 1989 after President George H. W. Bush signed the Presidential Proclamation 5975. National Stroke Awareness Month aims to increase the public awareness about the warning signs of stroke, symptoms of a stroke, stroke prevention, and the impact of stroke on survivors, families and caregivers. The United States Government, along with National Stroke Association, the American Heart Association, and other non-profits, work together to educate the American people about the prevention of stroke and provide key resources to stroke survivors.

== Symptoms ==
Because tPA, a clot-busting drug, can only be administered to stroke patients within the first three hours of the onset of stroke, recognizing the symptoms of stroke is very important. National Stroke Awareness Month aims to educate Americans to recognize the symptoms of stroke.

== Prevention ==
80 percent of strokes are caused by lifestyle; therefore, strokes are largely preventable. Although some stroke risk factors, such as age or race, cannot be controlled, there are many other steps individuals can take to reduce their risk of stroke.
