= Every Kid Outdoors =

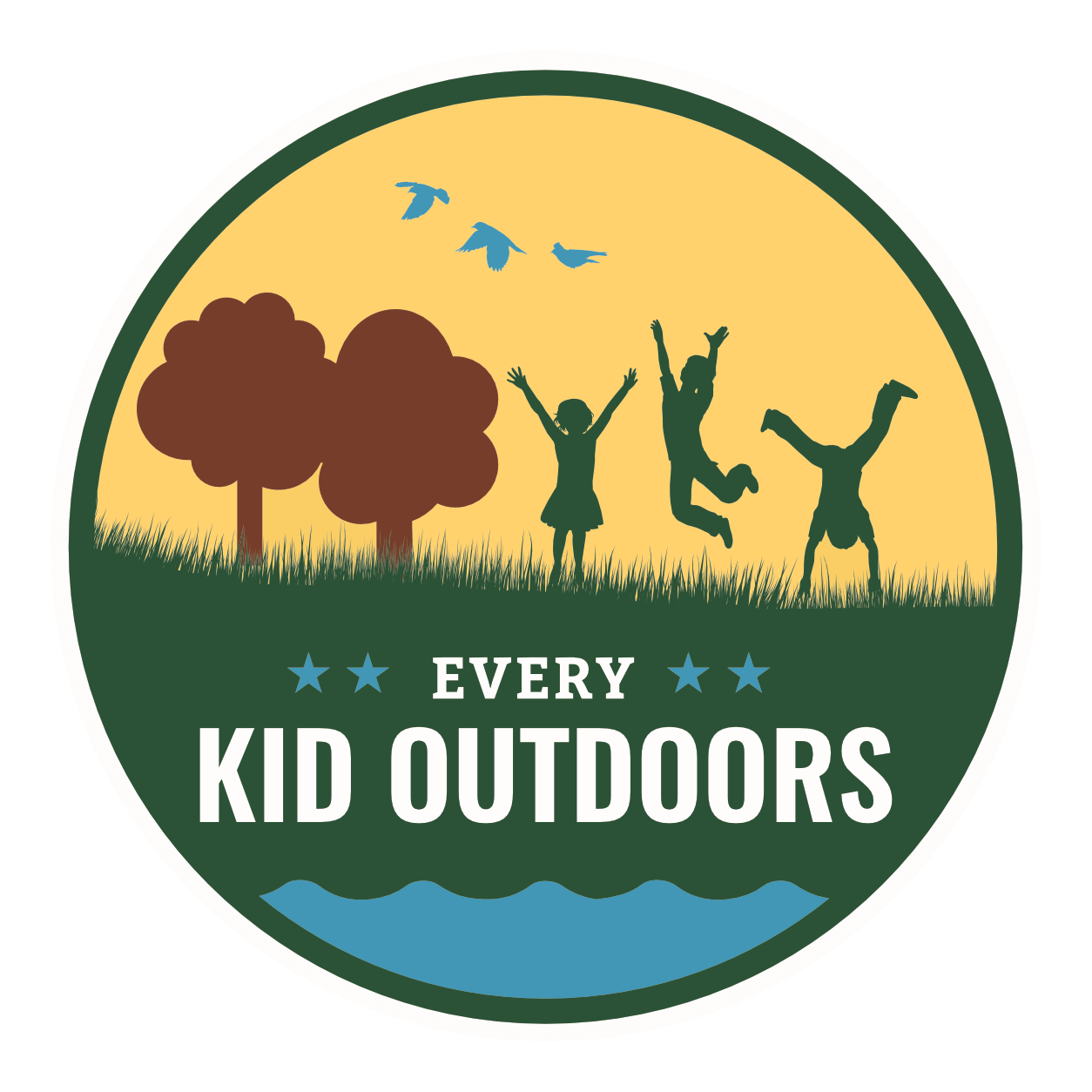
- Owner: National Park Service
- Creator: Barack Obama
- Registration: None
- Launched: September 1, 2015; 11 years ago

Every Kid Outdoors is a program run by the United States National Park Service in which fourth graders in the country receive free admission to national parks, federal land, and water recreation areas. The program was created by President Barack Obama in 2015 as Every Kid in a Park. It was renewed annually until 2019 when it was renewed for 7 years under the Every Kid Outdoors Act within the John D. Dingell Jr. Conservation, Management, and Recreation Act and lead to the program's name change.

== Overview ==
Under the Every Kid Outdoors program, the National Park Service gives all United States students in the fourth grade and their families access to an annual pass for free admission to federal recreation areas from September 1 to August 31 of the child's fourth grade year. Areas of admission include national parks, forests, monuments, and wildlife refuges. As of 2025, participating federal organizations included; Bureau of Land Management, United States Bureau of Reclamation, National Oceanic and Atmospheric Administration, National Park Service, U.S. Fish and Wildlife Service, U.S. Forest Service, and U.S. Army Corps of Engineers. Around the time of the announcement of the original initiative, an annual pass to national parks would normally cost $80.

Some states recognize the Every Kid Outdoors pass and accept it in lieu of fees for their state park systems, including Maryland and New York. California has a separate free state park pass system for fourth-graders in the state, known as the Adventure Pass.

== History ==
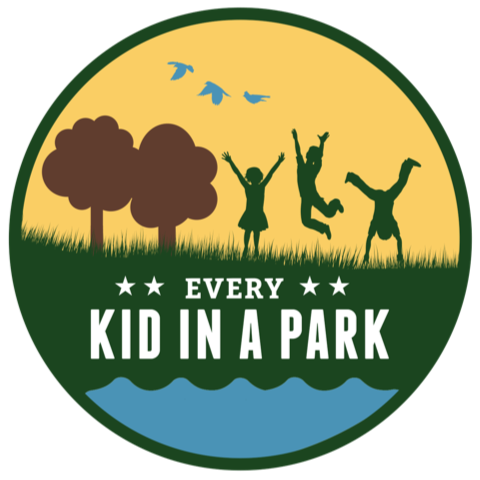
Original program logo

On February 19, 2015, President Obama announced the initiative. The initiative was launched in the fall of 2015 to coincide with the one hundredth anniversary of the National Park Service.

Fourth-graders were specifically chosen for "logistical, educational and instructional reasons", according to a White House official. The National Park Service as well as other public agencies already have fourth grade programs in place. Furthermore, many states within the United States teach state history during fourth grade, so National Park programs are relevant to the grade. Other reasons included ease in coordination of trips by a student's one teacher (rather than multiple teachers, as present in higher grades) and the idea of youth building early connections with nature.

Cost coverage for the free passes originally came from the National Park Service's $20-million budget for youth engagement programs. The National Park Foundation and National Park Service will provided transportation grants and educational materials to schools, with a focus on schools that have greater need. Such transportation grants are part of the National Park Foundation's "Ticket to Ride" program. Resources were also provided to facilitate the location of nearby parks and supporting youth programs.

Criticism of the initiative included concern over a possible increase in National Parks' reliance on Congress. Another concern of the initiative was its cost, but one source from The Washington Post projected that only $2.3 million in revenue would be lost.

The Every Kid in a Park original website everykidinapark.gov was designed and developed by 18F.

The Every Kid in a Park website everykidinapark.org was designed and developed by Sub Rosa.

In 2018, there was concern by park advocacy groups that the program would be ended by then United States Secretary of the Interior Ryan Zinke who criticized the program's cost. That June, the program was ultimately renewed for another year. The John D. Dingell Jr. Conservation, Management, and Recreation Act, signed in March 2019, included the Every Kid Outdoors Act, which authorized the program for an additional 7 years. In September 2019, the program changed its name to Every Kid Outdoors to match the name of the act.

The program was renewed again in the EXPLORE (Expanding Public Lands Outdoor Recreation Experiences) Act, when signed into law in early 2025. Within the act, Every Kid Outdoors Act was extended until 2031.

== See also ==
- United States National Park
- United States National Park Service
- National Park Foundation
- Let's Move!

== Bibliography ==
- "FACT SHEET: Launching the Every Kid in a Park Initiative and Designating New National Monuments". The White House. 19 February 2015.
- "Let's Get Every Kid in a Park". whitehouse.gov. 19 February 2015 – via National Archives.
