= Songs for a Healthier America =

Compilation album by Various artists
- Released: September 30, 2013
- Genre: Hip hop

Songs for a Healthier America is a 19-track compilation album by various artists, released in 2013 as a collaborative project by the Partnership for a Healthier America, whose honorary chair is First Lady Michelle Obama, and Hip Hop Public Health. The album encourages children to exercise and make healthy food choices. Guest vocalists include Ashanti, Doug E. Fresh, Monifah, Run DMC and Jordin Sparks; other contributors include Ariana Grande, Blink-182's Travis Barker and Matisyahu, performing as Salad Bar, Nils Lofgren of Bruce Springsteen's E Street Band, and Iman Shumpert Mixed and mastered by Roey Shamir for INFX Productions (INFX.net), at AREA51NYC Recording Studios.

== Track listing ==
No.	Title	Artist(s)	Length
1.	"U R What You Eat"	Matisyahu, Ariana Grande, Travis Barker, Kool Kojak and Salad Bar	3:58
2.	"Everybody"	Jordin Sparks, Doug E. Fresh, Dr. Mehment Oz and Dr. Olajide Williams	3:54
3.	"Let's Move"	Doug E. Fresh and Artie Green	3:27
4.	"Just Believe"	Ashanti, Artie Green, Gerry Gunn and Robbie Nova	3:28
5.	"Veggie Luv"	Monifah and J Rome	5:49
6.	"Hip Hop F.E.E.T (Finding Exercise Energy Thresholds)"	Darryl McDaniels (D.M.C.)	3:44
7.	"Stronger"	Jeremy Jordan, Shayna Steele, Nils Lofgren, Our Time Singers, Shuqui Autrey, Sebastian Borden, Ellie Harvey, Daniel Nazario, Isabella Negron, Julianna Padilla and Victoria Perlman	3:13
8.	"Give Myself a Try"	Ryan Beatty	4:08
9.	"Jump Up (It's a Good Day) [Let's Move Version]"	Brady Rymer and The Little Band That Could	3:10
10.	"Hip Hop L.E.A.N (Learning Exercise and Nutrition in Schools)"	Artie Green	3:47
11.	"Pass the Rock (Basketball Song)"	Iman Shumpert and Artie Green	3:10
12.	"Good Living"	Ashthon Jones	3:36
13.	"Beautiful"	Artie Green and Daisy Grant	4:15
14.	"Change the Game"	The Happiness Club (featuring Naledge, Jerome Matthews, Elana Schulman, Matthew Robinson, Jasmine Smith and Brandon Dodson)	3:15
15.	"Wanna Jump (Let's Move)"	Paul Burch and WPA Ballclub	2:23
16.	"Mother May I?"	Amelia Robinson of Mil's Trills	4:03
17.	"We Like Vegetables"	Los Barkers (featuring Lando, Bama and Travis Barker)	1:25
18.	"Get Up Sit Up"	Babi Floyd	3:00
19.	"One Step Forward"	Samite	3:19
