= Food Service Management Institute =

The Food Service Management Institute is a federal program in the United States that provides instruction, research, and materials in support of better food service management practices by child nutrition providers receiving federal support (e.g., schools operating school meal programs). It is permanently authorized under Section 21 of the National School Lunch Act (P.L. 79-396, as amended), with an annual entitlement funding level of $3 million.
