= John D. Dingell Jr. Conservation, Management, and Recreation Act =

United States federal omnibus lands act

- Long title: An act to provide for the management of the natural resources of the United States, and for other purposes.
- Enacted by: the 116th United States Congress

Citations
- Public law: Pub. L. 116–9 (text) (PDF)

Legislative history
- Introduced in the Senate as S. 47 by Lisa Murkowski (R–AK) on January 8, 2019; Passed the Senate on February 12, 2019 (92–8); Passed the House of Representatives on February 26, 2019 (363–62); Signed into law by President Donald Trump on March 12, 2019

The John D. Dingell Jr. Conservation, Management, and Recreation Act of 2019 is an omnibus lands act that protected public lands and modified management provisions. The bill designated more than 1,300,000 acres (5,300 km^{2}) of wilderness area, expanded several national parks and other areas of the National Park System, and established four new national monuments while redesignating others. Other provisions included making the Land and Water Conservation Fund permanent, protecting a number of rivers and historic sites, and withdrawing land near Yellowstone National Park and North Cascades National Park from mining.

Passage of the bill was hailed as a rare bipartisan environmental victory.

== Legislative history ==
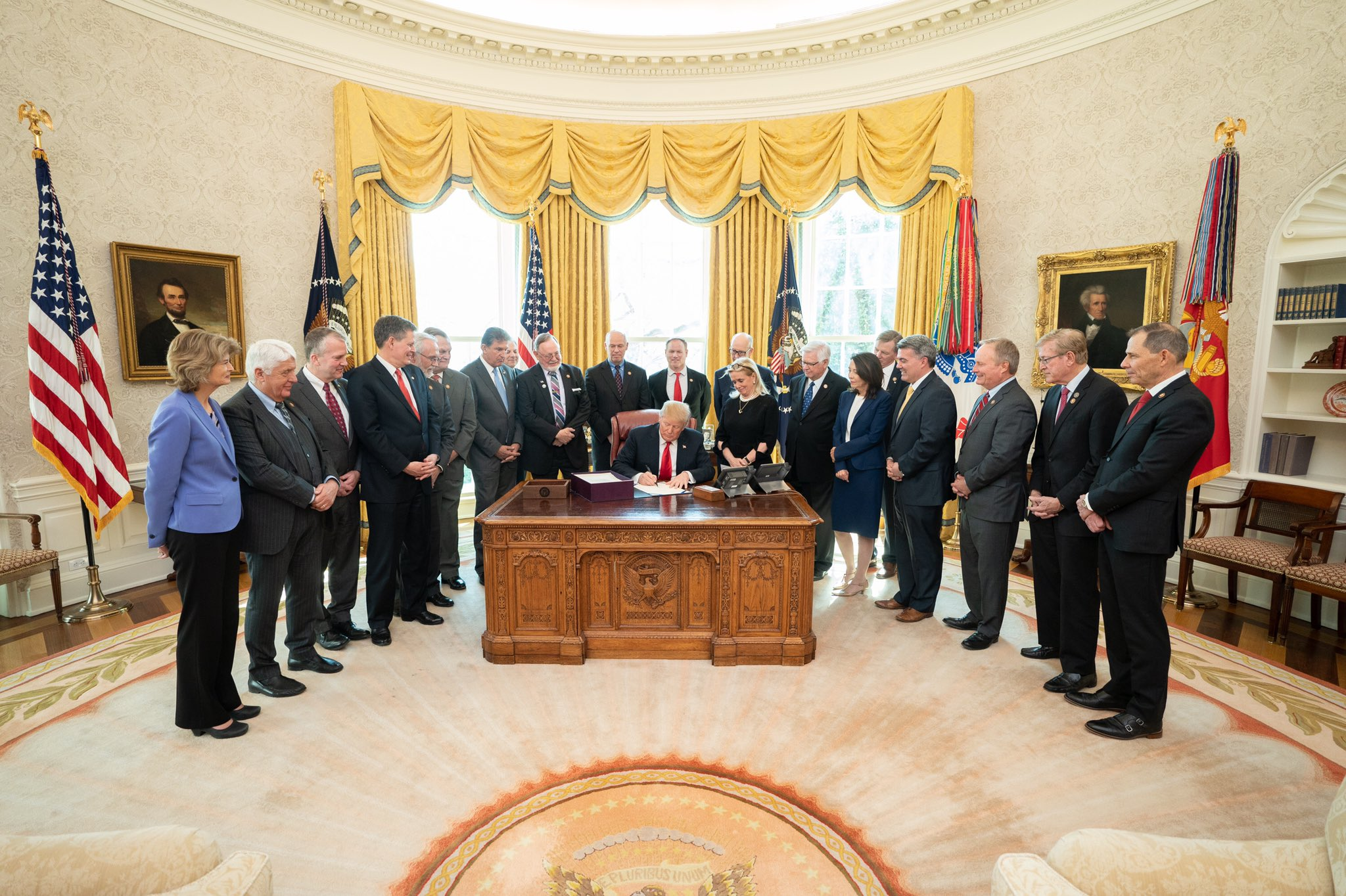
Signing of the Act in the Oval Office, March 12, 2019

The last major bill passed regarding public lands was the Omnibus Public Land Management Act of 2009. Since then many bills had been introduced but never passed; the Act incorporates more than 100 pieces of legislation, collectively introduced by some 50 senators and a range of representatives.

S. 47, initially the Natural Resources Management Act, was sponsored by Senators Lisa Murkowski of Alaska and Maria Cantwell of Washington, the chair and former ranking member of the Committee on Energy and Natural Resources. The Senate voted for the bill 92–8 on February 12, 2019, and the House of Representatives passed it 363–62 on February 26. President Donald Trump signed it into law on March 12, 2019, as P.L. 116–9.

Following initial passage, an addendum named the bill for John Dingell Jr. to honor the recently deceased former Congressperson who had sponsored multiple landmark conservation laws during his lengthy tenure, and was known as being an avid outdoorsman and conservationist.

The Congressional Budget Office estimated the bill would save $9 million in direct spending over 10 years and would generate substantial additional revenue.

== Provisions ==
The law is divided into nine titles, each containing a number of provisions. Selected major provisions are listed.

=== Title I ===
==== Subtitle A ====
Subtitle A authorizes land exchanges with and conveyances to local governments and private landowners:

- 92.95 acres (0.3762 km^{2}) added to Arapaho National Forest

==== Subtitle B ====
Subtitle B addresses management of public lands and the National Forest System:

- Authorizes Saint Francis Dam Disaster National Memorial and establishes Saint Francis Dam Disaster National Monument in California (353 acres; 1.43 km^{2})
- Establishes the John Wesley Powell National Conservation Area in Utah (29,868 acres; 120.87 km^{2})
- Allocates up to 448,000 acres (1,810 km^{2}) of federal land in Alaska to be conveyed to up to 2,800 Native Alaskans who are Vietnam War veterans and their heirs
- Designates 7,242 acres (29.31 km^{2}) as Ah-shi-sle-pah Wilderness in New Mexico

==== Subtitle C ====
Subtitle C designates new wilderness areas and other protected areas, in total expanding designated wilderness area by 1,300,000 acres (5,300 km^{2}) across four states.

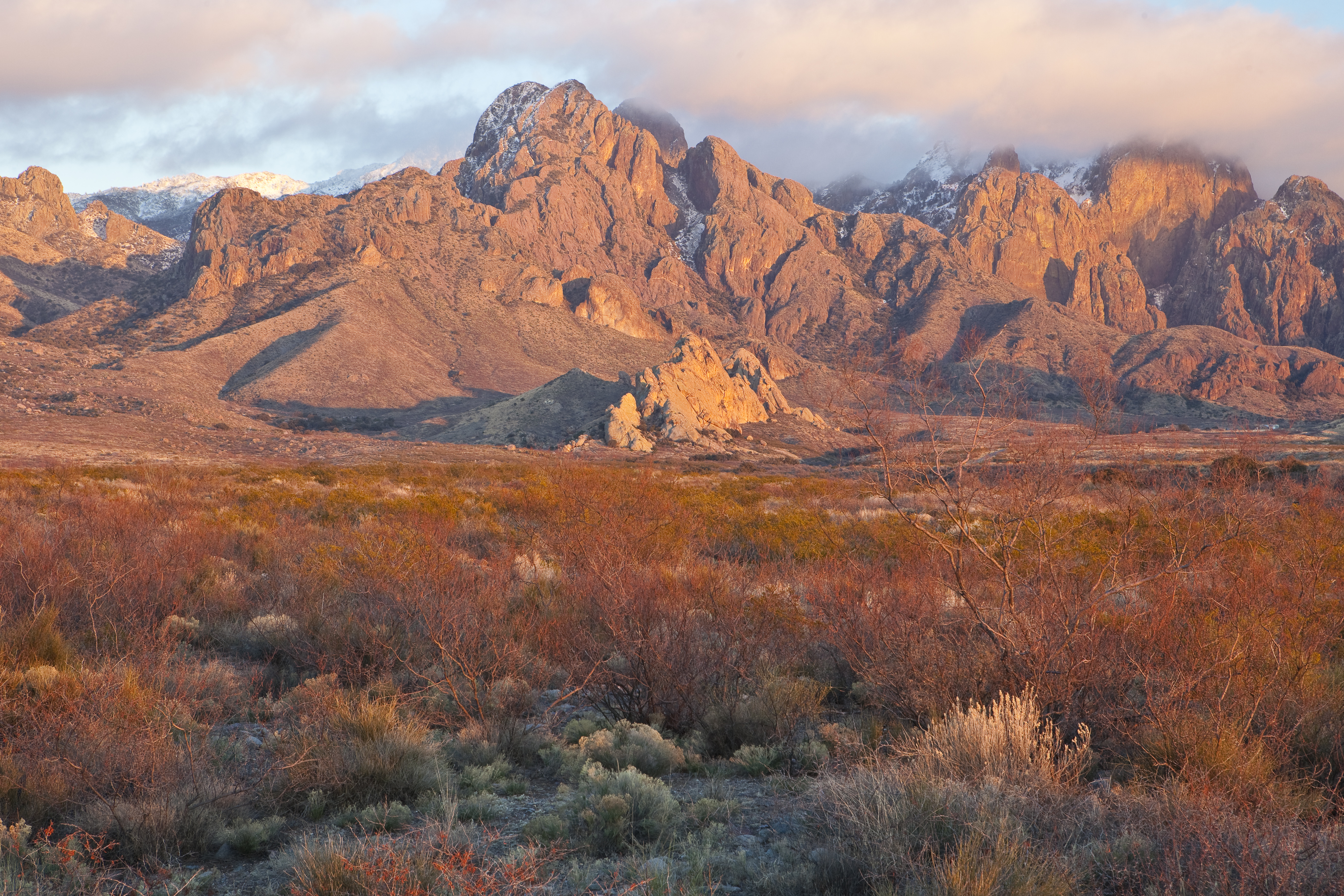
Nearly 250,000 acres (1,000 km^{2}) of the Organ Mountains–Desert Peaks National Monument were protected as wilderness area as a result of the Act.

- In Organ Mountains–Desert Peaks National Monument, New Mexico:
  - 27,673 acres (111.99 km^{2}) as Aden Lava Flow Wilderness
  - 13,902 acres (56.26 km^{2}) as Broad Canyon Wilderness
  - 16,936 acres (68.54 km^{2}) as Cinder Cone Wilderness
  - 12,155 acres (49.19 km^{2}) as East Potrillo Mountains Wilderness
  - 8,382 acres (33.92 km^{2}) as Mount Riley Wilderness
  - 19,916 acres (80.60 km^{2}) as Organ Mountains Wilderness
  - 105,085 acres (425.26 km^{2}) as Potrillo Mountains Wilderness
  - 16,776 acres (67.89 km^{2}) as Robledo Mountains Wilderness
  - 11,114 acres (44.98 km^{2}) as Sierra de las Uvas Wilderness
  - 9,616 acres (38.91 km^{2}) as Whitethorn Wilderness
- In Rio Grande del Norte National Monument, New Mexico:
  - 13,420 acres (54.3 km^{2}) as Cerro del Yuta Wilderness
  - 8,120 acres (32.9 km^{2}) as Río San Antonio Wilderness
- 340,079 acres (1,376.25 km^{2}) of the Methow Valley, in Okanogan–Wenatchee National Forest, Washington, is withdrawn from mining use
- Emigrant Crevice, in Gallatin National Forest, Montana, is withdrawn from mining use
- San Rafael Swell Recreation Area is established in Utah (216,995 acres; 878.15 km^{2})
- Segments of the Rogue River, Franklin Creek, Wasson Creek, Molalla River, and Elk River, Oregon, are added to the National Wild and Scenic Rivers System (280 miles; 450 km)
- Designates 30,621 acres (123.92 km^{2}) as Devil's Staircase Wilderness in Oregon

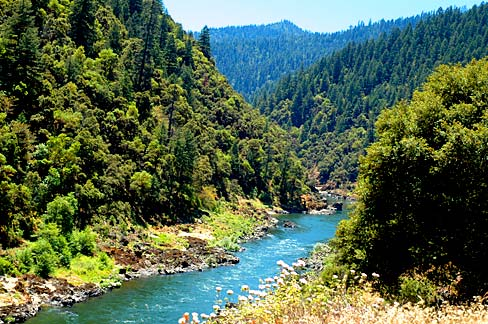
The Rogue River in Oregon, part of nearly 300 miles (480 km) of river added to the National Wild and Scenic Rivers System

- In Utah:
  - 18,192 acres (73.62 km^{2}) as Big Wild Horse Mesa Wilderness
  - 11,001 acres (44.52 km^{2}) as Cold Wash Wilderness
  - 142,995 acres (578.68 km^{2}) as Desolation Canyon Wilderness
  - 8,675 acres (35.11 km^{2}) as Devil's Canyon Wilderness
  - 13,832 acres (55.98 km^{2}) as Eagle Canyon Wilderness
  - 12,201 acres (49.38 km^{2}) as Horse Valley Wilderness
  - 54,643 acres (221.13 km^{2}) as Labyrinth Canyon Wilderness
  - 20,660 acres (83.6 km^{2}) as Little Ocean Draw Wilderness
  - 5,479 acres (22.17 km^{2}) as Little Wild Horse Canyon Wilderness
  - 19,338 acres (78.26 km^{2}) as Lower Last Chance Wilderness
  - 76,413 acres (309.23 km^{2}) as Mexican Mountain Wilderness
  - 16,343 acres (66.14 km^{2}) as Middle Wild Horse Mesa Wilderness
  - 98,023 acres (396.69 km^{2}) as Muddy Creek Wilderness
  - 7,433 acres (30.08 km^{2}) as Nelson Mountain Wilderness
  - 17,353 acres (70.23 km^{2}) as Red's Canyon Wilderness
  - 60,442 acres (244.60 km^{2}) as San Rafael Reef Wilderness
  - 49,130 acres (198.8 km^{2}) as Sid's Mountain Wilderness
  - 29,029 acres (117.48 km^{2}) as Turtle Canyon Wilderness
  - The Green River is added to the National Wild and Scenic Rivers System
- Jurassic National Monument (2,453 acres; 9.93 km^{2}) is established in Utah, managed by the Bureau of Land Management
- Rivers in Connecticut, Rhode Island, Massachusetts, and New Hampshire are added to the National Wild and Scenic Rivers System (225 miles; 362 km)
- In California:
  - 89,500 acres (362 km^{2}) as Avawatz Mountains Wilderness
  - 7,810 acres (31.6 km^{2}) as Great Falls Basin Wilderness
  - 80,090 acres (324.1 km^{2}) as Soda Mountains Wilderness
  - 17,250 acres (69.8 km^{2}) as Milpitas Wash Wilderness
  - 11,840 acres (47.9 km^{2}) as Buzzards Peak Wilderness
  - 1,250 acres (5.1 km^{2}) added to Golden Valley Wilderness
  - 52,410 acres (212.1 km^{2}) added to Kingston Range Wilderness
  - 9,350 acres (37.8 km^{2}) added to Palo Verde Mountains Wilderness
  - 10,860 acres (43.9 km^{2}) added to Indian Pass Mountains Wilderness
  - 88,044 acres (356.30 km^{2}) added to Death Valley National Park Wilderness
  - 7,141 acres (28.90 km^{2}) added to San Gorgonio Wilderness (San Bernardino National Forest)
- 35,929 acres (145.40 km^{2}) are added to Death Valley National Park
- 4,518 acres (18.28 km^{2}) are added to Joshua Tree National Park
- Alabama Hills National Scenic Area is established in California

=== Title II ===
==== Subtitle A ====
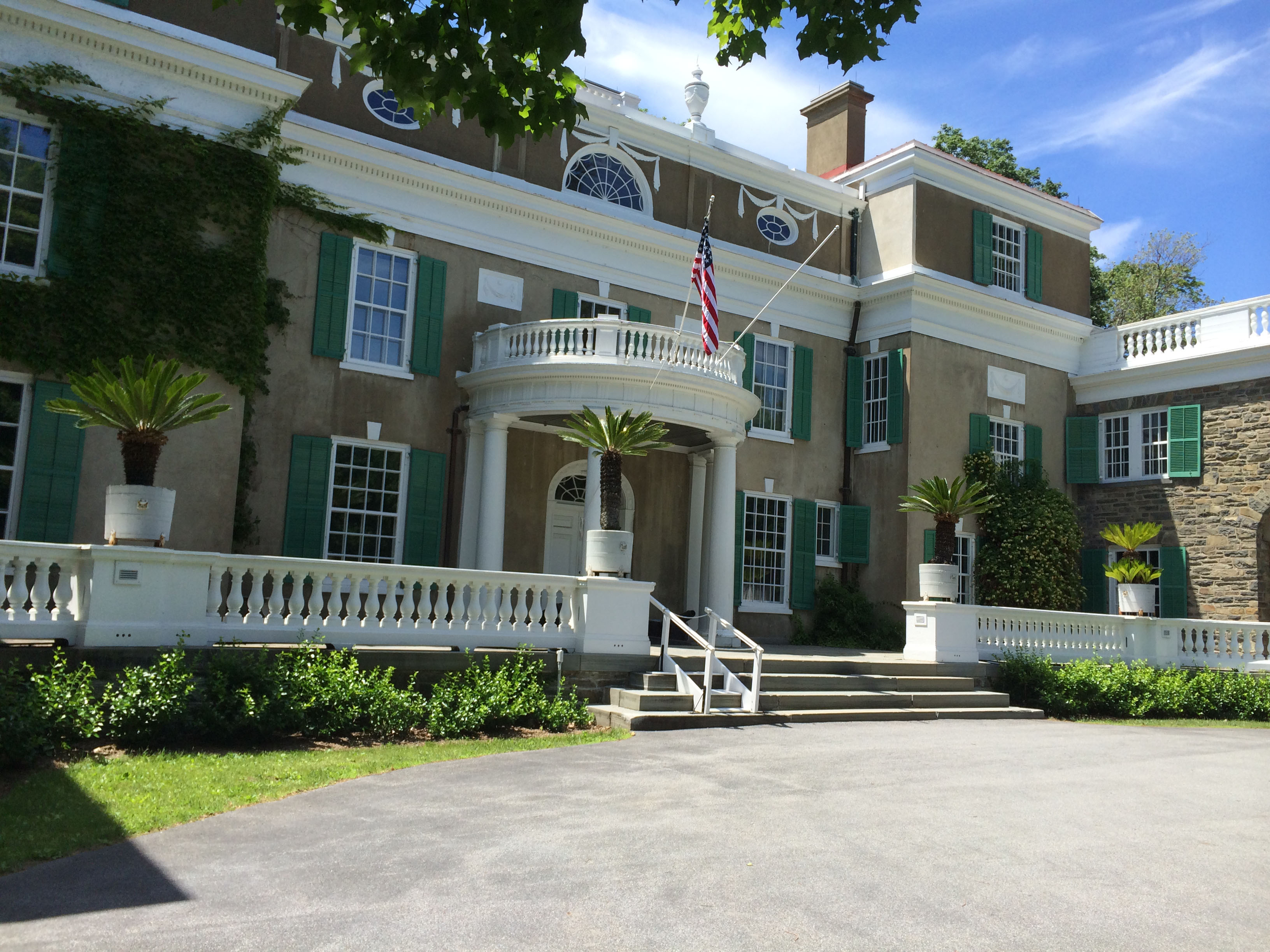
Home of Franklin D. Roosevelt National Historic Site, expanded by 89 acres (0.36 km^{2})

Subtitle A calls for special resource studies of the President James K. Polk Home & Museum in Tennessee, the Thurgood Marshall School in Maryland, President Street Station in Maryland, Granada War Relocation Center in Colorado, and the George W. Bush Childhood Home in Texas for consideration of inclusion in the National Park System.

==== Subtitle B ====
Subtitle B adjusts the boundaries of:

- Shiloh National Military Park, also creating Parker's Crossroads Battlefield as an affiliated area
- Ocmulgee Mounds National Historical Park, renamed from Ocmulgee National Monument
- Kennesaw Mountain National Battlefield Park
- Fort Frederica National Monument, adding 55 acres (0.22 km^{2})
- Fort Scott National Historic Site
- Florissant Fossil Beds National Monument, adding 300 acres (1.2 km^{2})
- Voyageurs National Park
- Acadia National Park, adding 1,441 acres (5.83 km^{2})
- Home of Franklin D. Roosevelt National Historic Site, adding 89 acres (0.36 km^{2})

==== Subtitle C ====
Subtitle C redesignates several NPS areas:

- Saint-Gaudens National Historic Site as Saint-Gaudens National Historical Park
- Names Robert Emmet Park
- Fort Sumter National Monument as Fort Sumter and Fort Moultrie National Historical Park
- Reconstruction Era National Monument as Reconstruction Era National Historical Park
- Golden Spike National Historic Site as Golden Spike National Historical Park
- World War II Valor in the Pacific National Monument is divided into Pearl Harbor National Memorial, Aleutian Islands World War II National Monument (FWS), and Tule Lake National Monument (NPS & FWS)
- Honouliuli National Monument as Honouliuli National Historic Site

==== Subtitle D ====
Subtitle D establishes new units of the National Park System:

- Medgar and Myrlie Evers Home National Monument, Mississippi
- Mill Springs Battlefield National Monument, Kentucky
- Camp Nelson Heritage National Monument, Kentucky (renamed from Camp Nelson National Monument as designated by presidential proclamation)

==== Subtitle E ====
Subtitle E amends miscellaneous management provisions:

- The Historically Black Colleges and Universities Historic Preservation Program is reauthorized.
- A commission is established to plan the Adams Memorial.

==== Subtitle F ====
Subtitle F relates to the National Trails System:

- Extends the North Country National Scenic Trail into Vermont
- Extends the Lewis and Clark National Historic Trail to Pennsylvania, Ohio, West Virginia, Kentucky, and Indiana
- Authorizes a study of the route of Zebulon Pike's Pike Expedition as Pike National Historic Trail

=== Title III ===
Title III reauthorizes the Land and Water Conservation Fund indefinitely. At least 40% of the funds, derived from offshore drilling royalties, are to be used for federal lands, and at least 40% are allocated to the states. (Note: Prior to the indefinite re-authorization, the Land and Water Conservation Fund had been expired for a period of five months. It had been funded through temporary measures before eventually being discontinued in September 2018.)

=== Title IV ===
Title IV states that public land managed by the Forest Service or Bureau of Land Management is open to hunting, fishing, and shooting, unless closed under certain procedures.

=== Title V ===
Title V establishes a National Volcano Early Warning and Monitoring System under the United States Geological Survey and reauthorizes the National Geologic Mapping Act of 1992.

=== Title VI ===
Title VI designates new National Heritage Areas:

- Appalachian Forest National Heritage Area, Maryland and West Virginia
- Maritime Washington National Heritage Area, Washington
- Mountains to Sound Greenway National Heritage Area, Washington
- Sacramento-San Joaquin Delta National Heritage Area, California
- Santa Cruz Valley National Heritage Area, Arizona
- Susquehanna National Heritage Area, Pennsylvania

It also lays out procedures for planning and management of national heritage areas.

=== Title VII ===
Title VII concerns wildlife management.

=== Title VIII ===
Title VIII concerns water and power and the Bureau of Reclamation. Among its provisions, it reauthorizes the Yakima River Basin Water Enhancement Project, with the purpose of promoting water conservation, water supply, habitat, and stream enhancement improvements in the Yakima River basin.

=== Title IX ===
Title IX has miscellaneous provisions:

- Extends the Every Kid in a Park program for 7 years – allows free admission for fourth grade students and their families to federal lands (Every Kid Outdoors Act)
- Expedites access to public lands and waives insurance requirements for search and rescue volunteers (Good Samaritan Search and Recovery Act)
- Allows Public Land Corps programs for youth and veterans to partner with more federal agencies on conservation and restoration projects (21st Century Conservation Service Corps Act)
- Designates the Nordic Museum in Seattle, Washington, as the National Nordic Museum (National Nordic Museum Act)
- Designates the George C. Marshall Museum and Research Library in Lexington, Virginia, as the National George C. Marshall Museum and Library
- Updates federal law to use modern terminology in reference to minority groups (21st Century Respect Act)
- Permits the designation of American World War II Heritage Cities to recognize preservation of World War II home-front history
- Designates the Quindaro Townsite National Commemorative Site
- Designates the National Comedy Center in Jamestown, New York.

=== Title XIII ===
Title XIII pertains to Off-Highway Vehicle Recreation Areas:

- Designates the Dumont Dunes Off-Highway Vehicle Recreation Area
- Designates the El Mirage Off-Highway Vehicle Area
- Designates the Rasor Off-Highway Vehicle Area
- Designates the Spangler Hills Off-Highway Vehicle Recreation Area
- Designates the Stoddard Valley Off-Highway Vehicle Recreation Area
- Expands the Johnson Valley Off-Highway Vehicle Recreation Area
