= National Stroke Association =

U.S. non-profit organization

- Founded: 1984; 42 years ago
- Dissolved: 2019; 7 years ago
- Type: nonprofit organization
- Purpose: Stroke
- Location: 9707 East Easter Lane, Suite B, Centennial, CO 80112, USA
- Region served: United States
- Website: www.stroke.org

The National Stroke Association was a U.S.-based nonprofit organization working between the years 1984–2019 to reduce the incidence and impact of stroke, the fourth leading cause of death in the United States. The association delivered education and programs focused on prevention, treatment, rehabilitation, and support for all impacted by stroke.

== History ==
National Stroke Association was formed in 1984 as a nonprofit healthcare organization focusing 100 percent of its resources on stroke. The organization is based in Centennial, Colorado. In 2006, the Annals of Neurology published National Stroke Association’s guidelines for the management of transient ischemic attacks. The final recommendations concluded that a TIA patient needs urgent evaluation and treatment.

In 2019, the National Stroke Association announced that it would be dissolved and its activities folded into the American Stroke Association, a division of the American Heart Association.

== Activities ==
The organization offered a variety of programs focused on informing the public about strokes, and supporting the victims of stroke and their caregivers. Careliving was an online social network targeting caregivers of stroke survivors, making information and resources available to them. NSA offered a series of webinars, called iHope, which were tailored to assist stroke survivors and caregivers by equipping them with the knowledge to take an active role in their post-stroke recovery. The Stroke Advocacy Network provided a venue for stroke survivors, caregivers and other stroke champions to communicate directly with elected officials.

To raise awareness of the condition, the NSA initiated several campaigns. Faces of Stroke was launched in 2011 to show the personal side of strokes, featuring victims of stroke and their families. It highlighted the symptoms of stroke, and featured some celebrity spokespeople such as Henry Winkler. The organization, along with the American Heart Association spearheaded the efforts to have May declared "National Stroke Awareness Month", which was accomplished when President George H. W. Bush signed an official proclamation in May 1989. In 2011 the NSA instituted the "Raising Awareness in Stroke Excellence Awards" (RAISE), which recognizes groups and individuals for their efforts to raise awareness about stroke.

== Publications ==
National Stroke Association offered subscriptions to various publications designed to maintain an ongoing conversation about stroke. StrokeSmart was a free publication which reached 270,000 people in the United States, filled with real-life stories of people impacted by stroke. The magazine updated readers on new science and helpful products and tips for recovery and lifestyle, as well as stroke survivor and caregiver experiences. In 2013, the magazine was redesigned and launched a new website. Brain Alert was a free monthly e-newsletter designed to keep stroke survivors, caregivers and healthcare professionals up to date on stroke news and information. Get Involved was a free bi-monthly e-newsletter designed to keep stroke survivors, caregivers and healthcare professionals informed about ways to be active against stroke. And the organization also produced The Professional Education Newsletter, a free monthly e-newsletter designed to keep healthcare professionals interested in stroke updated on educational offerings and important news from National Stroke Association.
