= Phil Lempert =

Phil Lempert

Phil Lempert (born April 1953) has been the Food Trends Editor for NBC's Today show since 1991. Known as the "SupermarketGuru", Lempert appears weekly with "New Product Hit's & Misses" on ABC Now and hosts a weekly radio show called Good Day with SupermarketGuru. Lempert is a contributing editor of Winsight Grocery Business, and a content provider for WGB. He has written for Newsday, Family Circle, and Meat & Seafood Merchandising, among other publications. Lempert is the host of the Farm Food Facts, Lost in the Supermarket and Winsight Live podcasts.

== Early career ==
Lempert worked at McDonald's and Howard Johnson's in high school, and after graduating Drexel University he worked in his family's food brokerage firm. He then attended Pratt Institute for graduate studies in package design and went on to create Lempert Design, Marketing & Advertising; during this time, Lempert began publishing the bi-weekly The Lempert Report. He went on to become senior vice president of Age Wave a lifestyle consulting firm that focuses on the life path of the baby boomer generation and then joined the Tribune Company as chairman of their food task force and created content for their newspapers, online services and television stations.

== Career ==
Lempert is the Founder and Editor of SupermarketGuru.com, a website with a consumer panel of more than 100,000 opt-in participants nationwide who offer opinions on food and health related issues and products, a food and health news hub created in 1994. As Editor, he produces a weekly "New Product Hit and Miss" segment and publishes e-publications targeted to consumers and businesses: Xtreme Retail23, Food Nutrition & Science, Coffee Chat News and Facts, Figures & the Future.

In 2007, Lempert founded "Phil’s Supermarket," the first supermarket to exist in the virtual world of Second Life.

In 2010, Lempert produced and hosted a documentary called Food Sense with Phil Lempert that aired on U.S. public television stations. The one-hour documentary follows a typical American breakfast of eggs, bacon, orange juice, toast, coffee and strawberries from farm and factory to table. Viewers are introduced to both organic and conventional food production methods and watch how the Mercantile Exchange and other issues impact food prices.

Lempert is the former host of a live call-in syndicated radio show called Shopping Smart and from 1989 to 2005 he hosted a weekly, live call-in radio show, Before You Bite with Phil Lempert. Lempert was a correspondent for BBC Radio 5 Live Up All Night, a monthly guest on BBC's International Journalists Debate and was a weekly contributor to KCRW’s Good Food program.

Lempert has appeared on The View, Oprah, Discovery Health and Extra and has been profiled and interviewed by USA Today, The New York Times, The Christian Science Monitor, The Philadelphia Inquirer, National Enquirer, Daily News, Newsday, Boston Herald, Ottawa Citizen, and Brandweek.

== Books and public speaking ==
Lempert is the author of Being the Shopper, Healthy, Wealthy & Wise, Phil Lempert’s Supermarket Shopping & Value Guide, Top Ten Trends for Baby Boomers and Crisis Management: A Workbook for Survival. Lempert also hosts the National Grocers Association annual "Best Bagger Competition."

== Personal life ==
Lempert is married to Laura B. Gray and resides in Santa Monica, California and New York City.
