= List of wilderness areas of the United States =

The National Wilderness Preservation System includes 806 wilderness areas protecting 111,889,002 acres (174,826.566 mi^{2}; 452,798.73 km^{2}) of federal land as of 2023. They are managed by four agencies:

- National Park Service (NPS)
- United States Forest Service (USFS)
- United States Fish and Wildlife Service (FWS)
- Bureau of Land Management (BLM)

These wilderness areas cover about 4.5% of the United States' land area, an area larger than the state of California. About 52% of the wilderness area is in Alaska, with 57,425,569 acres (89,727.452 mi^{2}; 232,393.03 km^{2}) of wilderness. They are located in 44 states (except in Connecticut, Delaware, Iowa, Kansas, Maryland, and Rhode Island) and Puerto Rico.

The NPS has oversight of 43,890,500 acres (68,578.9 mi^{2}; 177,619 km^{2}) of wilderness at 61 locations. The USFS oversees 36,160,078 acres (56,500.122 mi^{2}; 146,334.64 km^{2}) of wilderness areas in 447 areas. The FWS has responsibility for 20,702,350 acres (32,347.42 mi^{2}; 83,779.4 km^{2}) in 71 areas. BLM oversees 8,726,011 acres (13,634.392 mi^{2}; 35,312.91 km^{2}) at 224 sites. Some wilderness areas are managed by multiple agencies.

Some areas are designated wilderness by state or tribal governments. These are not governed by the Federal National Wilderness Preservation System.

This table lists all U.S. areas that have been designated by the United States Congress under the Wilderness Act. The designation date is the date that the wilderness was signed into law. Some areas have been expanded or otherwise changed since their original designation.

Wilderness	Located in	Agency	State	Area				Designated
Wilderness	Located in	Agency	State	Acres	Square miles	Hectare	Square km	Designated
Absaroka–Beartooth	Gallatin National Forest, Custer National Forest, Shoshone National Forest	USFS	MT, WY	943,648	1,474.450	381,881	3,818.81	March 27, 1978
Aden Lava Flow	Organ Mountains–Desert Peaks National Monument	BLM	NM	27,673	43.239	11,199	111.99	March 12, 2019
Agassiz	Agassiz National Wildlife Refuge	FWS	MN	4,000	6.3	1,600	16	October 19, 1976
Agua Tibia	Cleveland National Forest	USFS	CA	17,925	28.008	7,254	72.54	January 3, 1975
Ah-shi-sle-pah	New Mexico BLM Farmington District	BLM	NM	7,242	11.316	2,931	29.31	March 12, 2019
Aldo Leopold	Gila National Forest	USFS	NM	202,016	315.650	81,753	817.53	December 19, 1980
Aleutian Islands	Alaska Maritime National Wildlife Refuge	FWS	AK	1,300,000	2,000	530,000	5,300	December 2, 1980
Alexander Springs	Ocala National Forest	USFS	FL	7,941	12.408	3,214	32.14	September 28, 1984
Allegheny Islands	Allegheny National Forest	USFS	PA	372	0.581	151	1.51	October 30, 1984
Alpine Lakes	Wenatchee National Forest, Mount Baker–Snoqualmie National Forest	USFS	WA	391,988	612.481	158,632	1,586.32	July 12, 1976
Alta Toquima	Humboldt–Toiyabe National Forest	USFS	NV	35,860	56.03	14,510	145.1	December 5, 1989
Anaconda–Pintler	Beaverhead–Deerlodge National Forest, Bitterroot National Forest	USFS	MT	158,615	247.836	64,189	641.89	September 3, 1964
Andreafsky	Yukon Delta National Wildlife Refuge	FWS	AK	1,300,000	2,000	530,000	5,300	December 2, 1980
Ansel Adams	Sierra National Forest, Inyo National Forest, Devils Postpile National Monument	USFS, NPS	CA	231,279	361.373	93,595	935.95	September 3, 1964
Apache Creek	Prescott National Forest	USFS	AZ	5,666	8.853	2,293	22.93	August 28, 1984
Apache Kid	Cibola National Forest	USFS	NM	44,626	69.728	18,060	180.60	December 19, 1980
Aravaipa Canyon	Arizona BLM Gila District	BLM	AZ	19,410	30.33	7,850	78.5	August 28, 1984
Arc Dome	Humboldt–Toiyabe National Forest	BLM	NV	120,577	188.402	48,796	487.96	December 5, 1989
Argus Range	California BLM California Desert District	BLM	CA	65,726	102.697	26,598	265.98	October 31, 1994
Arrastra Mountain	Arizona BLM Colorado River District	BLM	AZ	129,800	202.8	52,500	525	November 28, 1990
Arrow Canyon	Nevada BLM Southern Nevada District	BLM	NV	27,502	42.972	11,130	111.30	November 6, 2002
Ashdown Gorge	Dixie National Forest	USFS	UT	7,043	11.005	2,850	28.50	September 28, 1984
Aubrey Peak	Arizona BLM Colorado River District	BLM	AZ	15,400	24.1	6,200	62	November 28, 1990
Avawatz Mountains	California BLM California Desert District	BLM	CA	89,500	139.8	36,200	362	March 12, 2019
Baboquivari Peak	Arizona BLM Gila District	BLM	AZ	2,040	3.19	830	8.3	November 28, 1990
Badger Creek	Mount Hood National Forest	USFS	OR	29,057	45.402	11,759	117.59	June 26, 1984
Badlands	Badlands National Park	NPS	SD	64,144	100.225	25,958	259.58	October 20, 1976
Bald Knob	Shawnee National Forest	USFS	IL	5,802	9.066	2,348	23.48	November 28, 1990
Bald Mountain	Humboldt-Toiyabe National Forest	USFS	NV	22,366	34.947	9,051	90.51	December 20, 2006
Bald River Gorge	Cherokee National Forest	USFS	TN	3,721	5.814	1,506	15.06	October 30, 1984
Bandelier	Bandelier National Monument	NPS	NM	23,267	36.355	9,416	94.16	October 20, 1976
Barbours Creek	George Washington and Jefferson National Forests	USFS	VA	5,382	8.409	2,178	21.78	June 7, 1988
Bay Creek	Shawnee National Forest	USFS	IL	2,759	4.311	1,117	11.17	November 28, 1990
Bear Wallow	Apache-Sitgreaves National Forest	USFS	AZ	11,080	17.31	4,480	44.8	August 28, 1984
Beartown	George Washington and Jefferson National Forests	USFS	VA	5,609	8.764	2,270	22.70	October 30, 1984
Beartrap Canyon	Utah BLM Color Country District	BLM	UT	40	0.063	16	0.16	March 30, 2009
Beauty Mountain	California BLM California Desert District	BLM	CA	15,627	24.417	6,324	63.24	March 30, 2009
Beaver Basin	Pictured Rocks National Lakeshore	NPS	MI	11,740	18.34	4,750	47.5	March 30, 2009
Beaver Creek	Daniel Boone National Forest	USFS	KY	4,753	7.427	1,923	19.23	January 3, 1975
Beaver Dam Mountains	Arizona BLM Arizona Strip District, Utah BLM Color Country District	BLM	AZ, UT	18,667	29.167	7,554	75.54	August 28, 1984
Becharof	Becharof National Wildlife Refuge	FWS	AK	400,000	620	160,000	1,600	December 2, 1980
Becky Peak	Nevada BLM Ely District	BLM	NV	18,119	28.311	7,332	73.32	December 20, 2006
Bell Mountain	Mark Twain National Forest	USFS	MO	9,143	14.286	3,700	37.00	December 22, 1980
Bering Sea	Alaska Maritime National Wildlife Refuge	FWS	AK	81,340	127.09	32,920	329.2	October 23, 1970
Big Branch	Green Mountain National Forest	USFS	VT	6,725	10.508	2,722	27.22	June 19, 1984
Big Draft	Monongahela National Forest	USFS	WV	5,147	8.042	2,083	20.83	March 30, 2009
Big Frog	Cherokee National Forest	USFS	TN	8,480	13.25	3,430	34.3	October 30, 1984
Big Gum Swamp	Osceola National Forest	USFS	FL	13,660	21.34	5,530	55.3	September 28, 1984
Big Horn Mountains	Arizona BLM Phoenix District	BLM	AZ	21,000	33	8,500	85	November 28, 1990
Big Island Lake	Hiawatha National Forest	USFS	MI	5,300	8.3	2,100	21	December 8, 1987
Big Jacks Creek	Idaho BLM Boise District	BLM	ID	52,753	82.427	21,348	213.48	March 30, 2009
Big Lake	Big Lake National Wildlife Refuge	FWS	AR	2,144	3.350	868	8.68	October 19, 1976
Big Laurel Branch	Cherokee National Forest	USFS	TN	10,811	16.892	4,375	43.75	October 16, 1986
Big Maria Mountains	California BLM California Desert District	BLM	CA	45,384	70.913	18,366	183.66	October 31, 1994
Big Rocks	Nevada BLM Ely District	BLM	NV	12,930	20.20	5,230	52.3	November 30, 2004
Big Slough	Davy Crockett National Forest	USFS	TX	3,455	5.398	1,398	13.98	October 30, 1984
Big Wild Horse Mesa	Utah BLM Green River District	BLM	UT	18,192	28.425	7,362	73.62	March 12, 2019
Bigelow Cholla Garden	California BLM California Desert District	BLM	CA	14,645	22.883	5,927	59.27	October 31, 1994
Bighorn Mountain	California BLM California Desert District, San Bernardino National Forest	BLM, USFS	CA	38,343	59.911	15,517	155.17	October 31, 1994
Billies Bay	Ocala National Forest	USFS	FL	3,092	4.831	1,251	12.51	September 28, 1984
Birkhead Mountains	Uwharrie National Forest	USFS	NC	5,025	7.852	2,034	20.34	June 19, 1984
Bisti/De-Na-Zin	New Mexico BLM Farmington District	BLM	NM	43,420	67.84	17,570	175.7	October 30, 1984
Black Canyon	Lake Mead National Recreation Area	NPS	NV	17,220	26.91	6,970	69.7	November 6, 2002
Black Canyon	Ochoco National Forest	USFS	OR	12,983	20.286	5,254	52.54	June 26, 1984
Black Canyon of the Gunnison	Black Canyon of the Gunnison National Park	NPS	CO	15,599	24.373	6,313	63.13	October 20, 1976
Black Creek	De Soto National Forest	USFS	MS	5,052	7.894	2,044	20.44	October 19, 1984
Black Elk	Black Hills National Forest	USFS	SD	13,426	20.978	5,433	54.33	December 22, 1980
Black Fork Mountain	Ouachita National Forest	USFS	AR, OK	13,139	20.530	5,317	53.17	October 19, 1984
Black Mountain	California BLM California Desert District	BLM	CA	20,548	32.106	8,315	83.15	October 31, 1994
Black Ridge Canyons	McInnis Canyons National Conservation Area	BLM	CO, UT	75,580	118.09	30,590	305.9	October 24, 2000
Black Rock Desert	Black Rock Desert-High Rock Canyon Emigrant Trails National Conservation Area	BLM	NV	314,835	491.930	127,409	1,274.09	December 21, 2000
Blackbeard Island	Blackbeard Island National Wildlife Refuge	FWS	GA	3,000	4.7	1,200	12	January 3, 1975
Blackjack Springs	Chequamegon–Nicolet National Forest	USFS	WI	5,908	9.231	2,391	23.91	October 21, 1978
Blackridge	Utah BLM Color Country District	BLM	UT	13,107	20.480	5,304	53.04	March 30, 2009
Blood Mountain	Chattahoochee–Oconee National Forest	USFS	GA	7,800	12.2	3,200	32	December 11, 1991
Blue Range	Gila National Forest	USFS	NM	29,304	45.788	11,859	118.59	December 19, 1980
Bob Marshall	Flathead National Forest, Lewis and Clark National Forest	USFS	MT	1,009,356	1,577.119	408,472	4,084.72	September 3, 1964
Bogoslof	Alaska Maritime National Wildlife Refuge	FWS	AK	175	0.273	71	0.71	October 23, 1970
Bosque del Apache	Bosque del Apache National Wildlife Refuge	FWS	NM	30,427	47.542	12,313	123.13	January 3, 1975
Boulder Creek	Umpqua National Forest	USFS	OR	19,886	31.072	8,048	80.48	June 26, 1984
Boulder River	Mount Baker National Forest	USFS	WA	49,343	77.098	19,968	199.68	July 3, 1984
Boundary Peak	Inyo National Forest	USFS	NV	10,000	16	4,000	40	December 5, 1989
Boundary Waters Canoe Area	Superior National Forest	USFS	MN	1,090,000	1,700	440,000	4,400	September 3, 1964
Box-Death Hollow	Dixie National Forest	USFS	UT	25,751	40.236	10,421	104.21	September 28, 1984
Bradwell Bay	Apalachicola National Forest	USFS	FL	24,602	38.441	9,956	99.56	January 3, 1975
Brasstown	Chattahoochee–Oconee National Forest	USFS	GA	12,896	20.150	5,219	52.19	October 27, 1986
Breadloaf	Green Mountain National Forest	USFS	VT	24,924	38.944	10,086	100.86	June 19, 1984
Breton	Breton National Wildlife Refuge	FWS	LA	5,000	7.8	2,000	20	January 3, 1975
Bridge Canyon	Lake Mead National Recreation Area	NPS	NV	7,761	12.127	3,141	31.41	November 6, 2002
Bridge Creek	Ochoco National Forest	USFS	OR	5,357	8.370	2,168	21.68	June 26, 1984
Bridger	Bridger–Teton National Forest	USFS	WY	428,087	668.886	173,241	1,732.41	September 3, 1964
Brigantine	Edwin B. Forsythe National Wildlife Refuge	FWS	NJ	6,681	10.439	2,704	27.04	January 3, 1975
Bright Star	Jawbone-Butterbredt Area of Critical Environmental Concern	BLM	CA	8,191	12.798	3,315	33.15	October 31, 1994
Bristlecone	Nevada BLM Ely District	BLM	NV	14,095	22.023	5,704	57.04	December 20, 2006
Bristol Cliffs	Green Mountain National Forest	USFS	VT	3,750	5.86	1,520	15.2	January 3, 1975
Bristol Mountains	California BLM California Desert District	BLM	CA	71,389	111.545	28,890	288.90	October 31, 1994
Broad Canyon	Organ Mountains–Desert Peaks National Monument	BLM	NM	13,902	21.722	5,626	56.26	March 12, 2019
Bruneau–Jarbidge Rivers	Idaho BLM Boise District	BLM	ID	89,777	140.277	36,331	363.31	March 30, 2009
Brush Mountain	George Washington and Jefferson National Forests	USFS	VA	4,794	7.491	1,940	19.40	March 30, 2009
Brush Mountain East	George Washington and Jefferson National Forests	USFS	VA	3,743	5.848	1,515	15.15	March 30, 2009
Buckhorn	Olympic National Forest	USFS	WA	44,319	69.248	17,935	179.35	July 3, 1984
Bucks Lake	Plumas National Forest	USFS	CA	23,958	37.434	9,695	96.95	September 28, 1984
Buffalo National River	Buffalo National River	NPS	AR	34,933	54.583	14,137	141.37	November 10, 1978
Buffalo Peaks	San Isabel National Forest, Pike National Forest	USFS	CO	41,232	64.425	16,686	166.86	August 13, 1993
Bull of the Woods	Mount Hood National Forest	USFS	OR	36,731	57.392	14,865	148.65	June 26, 1984
Burden Falls	Shawnee National Forest	USFS	IL	3,694	5.772	1,495	14.95	November 28, 1990
Buzzards Peak	California BLM California Desert District	BLM	CA	11,840	18.50	4,790	47.9	March 12, 2019
Byers Peak	Arapaho National Forest	USFS	CO	8,801	13.752	3,562	35.62	August 13, 1993
Cabeza Prieta	Cabeza Prieta National Wildlife Refuge	FWS	AZ	803,418	1,255.341	325,132	3,251.32	November 28, 1990
Cabinet Mountains	Kootenai National Forest, Kaniksu National Forest	USFS	MT	94,272	147.300	38,151	381.51	September 3, 1964
Cache Creek	Berryessa Snow Mountain National Monument	BLM	CA	27,294	42.647	11,045	110.45	October 17, 2006
Cache La Poudre	Roosevelt National Forest	USFS	CO	9,258	14.466	3,747	37.47	December 22, 1980
Cadiz Dunes	Mojave Trails National Monument	BLM	CA	19,935	31.148	8,067	80.67	October 31, 1994
Cahuilla Mountain	San Bernardino National Forest	USFS	CA	5,585	8.727	2,260	22.60	March 30, 2009
Cain Mountain	Nevada BLM Winnemucca District	BLM	NV	14,050	21.95	5,690	56.9	December 23, 2022
Calico Mountains	Black Rock Desert-High Rock Canyon Emigrant Trails National Conservation Area	BLM	NV	64,968	101.513	26,292	262.92	December 21, 2000
Canaan Mountain	Utah BLM Color Country District	BLM	UT	44,447	69.448	17,987	179.87	March 30, 2009
Caney Creek	Ouachita National Forest	USFS	AR	14,460	22.59	5,850	58.5	January 3, 1975
Cape Romain	Cape Romain National Wildlife Refuge	FWS	SC	29,000	45	12,000	120	January 3, 1975
Capitan Mountains	Lincoln National Forest	USFS	NM	34,658	54.153	14,026	140.26	December 19, 1980
Caribou	Lassen National Forest	USFS	CA	20,546	32.103	8,315	83.15	September 3, 1964
Caribou-Speckled Mountain	White Mountain National Forest	USFS	ME	11,233	17.552	4,546	45.46	September 28, 1990
Carlsbad Caverns	Carlsbad Caverns National Park	NPS	NM	33,125	51.758	13,405	134.05	November 10, 1978
Carrizo Gorge	California BLM California Desert District	BLM	CA	14,740	23.03	5,970	59.7	October 31, 1994
Carson-Iceberg	Stanislaus National Forest, Humboldt–Toiyabe National Forest	USFS	CA	161,181	251.845	65,228	652.28	September 28, 1984
Castle Crags	Shasta–Trinity National Forest	USFS	CA	8,627	13.480	3,491	34.91	September 28, 1984
Castle Creek	Prescott National Forest	USFS	AZ	25,215	39.398	10,204	102.04	August 28, 1984
Catfish Lake South	Croatan National Forest	USFS	NC	8,530	13.33	3,450	34.5	June 19, 1984
Cebolla	El Malpais National Conservation Area	BLM	NM	61,600	96.3	24,900	249	December 31, 1987
Cecil D. Andrus–White Clouds	Sawtooth National Forest	USFS	ID	90,769	141.827	36,733	367.33	August 7, 2015
Cedar Bench	Prescott National Forest	USFS	AZ	14,950	23.36	6,050	60.5	August 28, 1984
Cedar Keys	Cedar Keys National Wildlife Refuge	FWS	FL	379	0.592	153	1.53	August 7, 1972
Cedar Mountain	Utah BLM West Desert District	BLM	UT	99,428	155.356	40,237	402.37	January 6, 2006
Cedar Roughs	California BLM Central California District	BLM	CA	6,287	9.823	2,544	25.44	October 17, 2006
Cerro del Yuta	Rio Grande del Norte National Monument	BLM	NM	13,420	20.97	5,430	54.3	March 12, 2019
Chama River Canyon	Santa Fe National Forest, Carson National Forest	USFS	NM	50,300	78.6	20,400	204	February 24, 1978
Chamisso	Alaska Maritime National Wildlife Refuge	FWS	AK	455	0.711	184	1.84	January 3, 1975
Chanchelulla	Shasta–Trinity National Forest	USFS	CA	8,200	12.8	3,300	33	September 28, 1984
Charles C. Deam	Hoosier National Forest	USFS	IN	12,463	19.473	5,044	50.44	December 22, 1982
Chase Lake	Chase Lake National Wildlife Refuge	FWS	ND	4,155	6.492	1,681	16.81	January 3, 1975
Chassahowitzka	Chassahowitzka National Wildlife Refuge	FWS	FL	23,579	36.842	9,542	95.42	October 19, 1976
Cheaha	Talladega National Forest	USFS	AL	7,245	11.320	2,932	29.32	January 3, 1983
Chemehuevi Mountains	California BLM California Desert District	BLM	CA	85,864	134.163	34,748	347.48	October 31, 1994
Chimney Peak	California BLM California Desert District	BLM	CA	13,140	20.53	5,320	53.2	October 31, 1994
Chiricahua	Coronado National Forest	USFS	AZ	87,700	137.0	35,500	355	September 3, 1964
Chiricahua National Park	Chiricahua National Park	NPS	AZ	10,290	16.08	4,160	41.6	October 20, 1976
Chuck River	Tongass National Forest	USFS	AK	74,506	116.416	30,152	301.52	November 28, 1990
Chuckwalla Mountains	California BLM California Desert District	BLM	CA	99,548	155.544	40,286	402.86	October 31, 1994
Chumash	Los Padres National Forest	USFS	CA	38,150	59.61	15,440	154.4	June 19, 1992
Cinder Cone	Organ Mountains–Desert Peaks National Monument	BLM	NM	16,935	26.461	6,853	68.53	March 12, 2019
Citico Creek	Cherokee National Forest	USFS	TN	16,226	25.353	6,566	65.66	October 30, 1984
Clackamas	Mount Hood National Forest	USFS	OR	9,181	14.345	3,715	37.15	March 30, 2009
Clan Alpine Mountains		BLM	NV	128,362	200.566	51,946	519.46	December 23, 2022
Clear Springs	Shawnee National Forest	USFS	IL	4,741	7.408	1,919	19.19	November 28, 1990
Clearwater	Snoqualmie National Forest	USFS	WA	14,647	22.886	5,927	59.27	July 3, 1984
Cleghorn Lakes	California BLM California Desert District	BLM	CA	39,167	61.198	15,850	158.50	October 31, 1994
Clifty	Daniel Boone National Forest	USFS	KY	13,379	20.905	5,414	54.14	December 23, 1985
Clipper Mountain	Mojave Trails National Monument	BLM	CA	33,843	52.880	13,696	136.96	October 31, 1994
Cloud Peak	Bighorn National Forest	USFS	WY	189,039	295.373	76,501	765.01	October 30, 1984
Clover Mountains	Nevada BLM Ely District	BLM	NV	85,668	133.856	34,669	346.69	November 30, 2004
Cohutta	Chattahoochee–Oconee National Forest, Cherokee National Forest	USFS	GA, TN	36,977	57.777	14,964	149.64	January 3, 1975
Cold Wash	Utah BLM Green River District	BLM	UT	11,001	17.189	4,452	44.52	March 12, 2019
Collegiate Peaks	San Isabel National Forest, Gunnison National Forest, White River National Forest	USFS	CO	167,584	261.850	67,819	678.19	December 22, 1980
Colonel Bob	Olympic National Forest	USFS	WA	11,855	18.523	4,798	47.98	July 3, 1984
Columbine–Hondo	Carson National Forest	USFS	NM	44,698	69.841	18,089	180.89	December 19, 2014
Comanche Peak	Roosevelt National Forest	USFS	CO	66,791	104.361	27,029	270.29	December 22, 1980
Congaree National Park	Congaree National Park	NPS	SC	21,700	33.9	8,800	88	October 24, 1988
Copper Salmon	Rogue River–Siskiyou National Forest	USFS	OR	13,757	21.495	5,567	55.67	March 30, 2009
Coronation Island	Tongass National Forest	USFS	AK	19,232	30.050	7,783	77.83	December 2, 1980
Coso Range	California BLM California Desert District	BLM	CA	49,296	77.025	19,949	199.49	October 31, 1994
Cottonwood Canyon	Red Cliffs National Conservation Area	BLM	UT	11,667	18.230	4,721	47.21	March 30, 2009
Cottonwood Forest	Dixie National Forest	USFS	UT	2,643	4.130	1,070	10.70	March 30, 2009
Cottonwood Point	Arizona BLM Arizona Strip District	BLM	AZ	6,860	10.72	2,780	27.8	August 28, 1984
Cougar Canyon	Utah BLM Color Country District	BLM	UT	10,648	16.638	4,309	43.09	March 30, 2009
Coyote Mountains	Arizona BLM Gila District	BLM	AZ	5,080	7.94	2,060	20.6	November 28, 1990
Coyote Mountains	California BLM California Desert District	BLM	CA	18,631	29.111	7,540	75.40	October 31, 1994
Crab Orchard	Crab Orchard National Wildlife Refuge	FWS	IL	4,050	6.33	1,640	16.4	October 19, 1976
Cranberry	Monongahela National Forest	USFS	WV	47,741	74.595	19,320	193.20	January 13, 1983
Craters of the Moon	Craters of the Moon National Monument and Preserve	NPS	ID	43,243	67.567	17,500	175.00	October 23, 1970
Cruces Basin	Carson National Forest	USFS	NM	18,000	28	7,300	73	December 19, 1980
Cucamonga	Angeles National Forest, San Bernardino National Forest	USFS	CA	12,781	19.970	5,172	51.72	September 3, 1964
Cumberland Island	Cumberland Island National Seashore	NPS	GA	9,886	15.447	4,001	40.01	September 8, 1982
Cummins Creek	Siuslaw National Forest	USFS	OR	9,443	14.755	3,821	38.21	June 26, 1984
Currant Mountain	Humboldt–Toiyabe National Forest	USFS	NV	47,357	73.995	19,165	191.65	December 5, 1989
Daniel J. Evans	Olympic National Park	NPS	WA	876,669	1,369.795	354,775	3,547.75	November 16, 1988
Dark Canyon	Bears Ears National Monument	USFS	UT	47,116	73.619	19,067	190.67	September 28, 1984
Darwin Falls	California BLM California Desert District	BLM	CA	8,189	12.795	3,314	33.14	October 31, 1994
Dead Mountains	California BLM California Desert District	BLM	CA	47,158	73.684	19,084	190.84	October 31, 1994
Death Valley	Death Valley National Park	NPS	CA	3,190,455	4,985.086	1,291,131	12,911.31	October 31, 1994
Deep Creek	Utah BLM Color Country District	BLM	UT	3,291	5.142	1,332	13.32	March 30, 2009
Deep Creek North	Utah BLM Color Country District	BLM	UT	4,478	6.997	1,812	18.12	March 30, 2009
Delamar Mountains	Nevada BLM Ely District	BLM	NV	111,066	173.541	44,947	449.47	November 30, 2004
Delirium	Hiawatha National Forest	USFS	MI	11,952	18.675	4,837	48.37	December 8, 1987
Denali	Denali National Park and Preserve	NPS	AK	2,124,783	3,319.973	859,869	8,598.69	December 2, 1980
Desatoya Mountains		BLM	NV	40,303	62.973	16,310	163.10	December 23, 2022
Deseret Peak	Wasatch National Forest	USFS	UT	25,212	39.394	10,203	102.03	September 28, 1984
Desolation	Eldorado National Forest, Lake Tahoe Basin Management Unit	USFS	CA	63,475	99.180	25,687	256.87	October 10, 1969
Desolation Canyon	Utah BLM Green River District	BLM	UT	142,996	223.431	57,868	578.68	March 12, 2019
Devil's Canyon	Utah BLM Green River District	BLM	UT	8,675	13.555	3,511	35.11	March 12, 2019
Devils Backbone	Mark Twain National Forest	USFS	MO	6,687	10.448	2,706	27.06	December 22, 1980
Devil's Staircase	Siuslaw National Forest, Oregon-Washington BLM Coos Bay District	BLM, USFS	OR	31,107	48.605	12,589	125.89	March 12, 2019
Diamond Peak	Willamette National Forest, Deschutes National Forest	USFS	OR	52,611	82.205	21,291	212.91	September 3, 1964
Dick Smith	Los Padres National Forest	USFS	CA	67,800	105.9	27,400	274	September 28, 1984
Dinkey Lakes	Sierra National Forest	USFS	CA	30,000	47	12,000	120	September 28, 1984
Doc's Pass	Utah BLM Color Country District	BLM	UT	18,216	28.463	7,372	73.72	March 30, 2009
Dolly Sods	Monongahela National Forest	USFS	WV	17,776	27.775	7,194	71.94	January 3, 1975
Dome	Santa Fe National Forest	USFS	NM	5,200	8.1	2,100	21	December 19, 1980
Domeland	Sequoia National Forest, California BLM California Desert District	USFS, BLM	CA	133,160	208.06	53,890	538.9	September 3, 1964
Dominguez Canyon	Dominguez-Escalante National Conservation Area	BLM	CO	66,280	103.56	26,820	268.2	March 30, 2009
Dos Cabezas Mountains	Arizona BLM Gila District	BLM	AZ	11,700	18.3	4,700	47	November 28, 1990
Drift Creek	Siuslaw National Forest	USFS	OR	5,897	9.214	2,386	23.86	June 26, 1984
Dry Creek	Ouachita National Forest	USFS	AR	6,310	9.86	2,550	25.5	October 19, 1984
Dugger Mountain	Talladega National Forest	USFS	AL	9,200	14.4	3,700	37	December 9, 1999
Eagle Canyon	Utah BLM Green River Unit	BLM	UT	13,832	21.613	5,598	55.98	March 12, 2019
Eagle Cap	Wallowa–Whitman National Forest	USFS	OR	359,991	562.486	145,683	1,456.83	September 3, 1964
Eagles Nest	White River National Forest	USFS	CO	133,471	208.548	54,014	540.14	July 12, 1976
Eagletail Mountains	Arizona BLM Colorado River District	BLM	AZ	97,880	152.94	39,610	396.1	November 28, 1990
East Cactus Plain	Arizona BLM Colorado River District	BLM	AZ	14,630	22.86	5,920	59.2	November 28, 1990
East Fork	Ozark–St. Francis National Forest	USFS	AR	10,688	16.700	4,325	43.25	October 19, 1984
East Fork High Rock Canyon	Black Rock Desert-High Rock Canyon Emigrant Trails National Conservation Area	BLM	NV	52,938	82.716	21,423	214.23	December 21, 2000
East Humboldt	Humboldt–Toiyabe National Forest	USFS	NV	36,670	57.30	14,840	148.4	December 5, 1989
East Potrillo Mountains	Organ Mountains–Desert Peaks National Monument	BLM	NM	12,155	18.992	4,919	49.19	March 12, 2019
El Paso Mountains	California BLM California Desert District	BLM	CA	23,669	36.983	9,579	95.79	October 31, 1994
El Toro	El Yunque National Forest	USFS	PR	10,000	16	4,000	40	December 2, 2005
Eldorado	Lake Mead National Recreation Area, Nevada BLM Southern Nevada District	NPS, BLM	NV	32,016	50.025	12,956	129.56	November 6, 2002
Elkhorn Ridge	California BLM Northern California District	BLM	CA	11,001	17.189	4,452	44.52	October 17, 2006
Ellicott Rock	Sumter National Forest, Nantahala National Forest, Chattahoochee–Oconee National Forest	USFS	GA, NC, SC	8,274	12.928	3,348	33.48	January 3, 1975
Emigrant	Stanislaus National Forest	USFS	CA	112,277	175.433	45,437	454.37	January 3, 1975
Encampment River	Medicine Bow–Routt National Forest	USFS	WY	10,124	15.819	4,097	40.97	October 30, 1984
Endicott River	Tongass National Forest	USFS	AK	98,729	154.264	39,954	399.54	December 2, 1980
Escudilla	Apache-Sitgreaves National Forest	USFS	AZ	5,200	8.1	2,100	21	August 28, 1984
Far South Egans	Nevada BLM Ely District	BLM	NV	36,299	56.717	14,690	146.90	November 30, 2004
Farallon	Farallon Islands National Wildlife Refuge	FWS	CA	141	0.220	57	0.57	December 26, 1974
Fish Creek Mountains	California BLM California Desert District	BLM	CA	21,390	33.42	8,660	86.6	October 31, 1994
Fishhooks	Arizona BLM Gila District	BLM	AZ	10,500	16.4	4,200	42	November 28, 1990
Fitzpatrick	Shoshone National Forest	USFS	WY	198,525	310.195	80,340	803.40	October 19, 1976
Flat Tops	Medicine Bow–Routt National Forest, White River National Forest	USFS	CO	235,214	367.522	95,188	951.88	December 12, 1975
Flatside	Ouachita National Forest	USFS	AR	10,181	15.908	4,120	41.20	October 19, 1984
Florida Keys	National Key Deer Refuge, Key West National Wildlife Refuge, Great White Heron National Wildlife Refuge	FWS	FL	6,197	9.683	2,508	25.08	January 3, 1975
Forrester Island	Alaska Maritime National Wildlife Refuge	FWS	AK	2,832	4.425	1,146	11.46	October 23, 1970
Fort Niobrara	Fort Niobrara National Wildlife Refuge	FWS	NE	4,635	7.242	1,876	18.76	October 19, 1976
Fortification Range	Nevada BLM Ely District	BLM	NV	30,539	47.717	12,359	123.59	November 30, 2004
Fossil Ridge	Gunnison National Forest	USFS	CO	31,992	49.988	12,947	129.47	August 13, 1993
Fossil Springs	Coconino National Forest	USFS	AZ	10,434	16.303	4,222	42.22	August 28, 1984
Four Peaks	Tonto National Forest	USFS	AZ	61,074	95.428	24,716	247.16	August 28, 1984
Frank Church–River of No Return	Bitterroot National Forest, Boise National Forest, Salmon–Challis National Forest, Nez Perce National Forest, Payette National Forest, Idaho BLM Coeur d'Alene District	USFS, BLM	ID	2,366,907	3,698.292	957,853	9,578.53	July 23, 1980
Funeral Mountains	California BLM California Desert District	BLM	CA	25,707	40.167	10,403	104.03	October 31, 1994
Galiuro	Coronado National Forest	USFS	AZ	76,317	119.245	30,884	308.84	September 3, 1964
Garcia	Los Padres National Forest	USFS	CA	14,100	22.0	5,700	57	June 19, 1992
Garden Mountain	George Washington and Jefferson National Forests	USFS	VA	3,291	5.142	1,332	13.32	March 30, 2009
Garden of the Gods	Shawnee National Forest	USFS	IL	3,953	6.177	1,600	16.00	November 28, 1990
Gates of the Arctic	Gates of the Arctic National Park	NPS	AK	7,167,192	11,198.738	2,900,460	29,004.60	December 2, 1980
Gates of the Mountains	Helena National Forest	USFS	MT	28,562	44.628	11,559	115.59	September 3, 1964
Gaylord Nelson	Apostle Islands National Lakeshore	NPS	WI	33,500	52.3	13,600	136	December 8, 2004
Gearhart Mountain	Fremont-Winema National Forest	USFS	OR	22,684	35.444	9,180	91.80	September 3, 1964
Gee Creek	Cherokee National Forest	USFS	TN	2,493	3.895	1,009	10.09	January 3, 1975
George D. Aiken	Green Mountain National Forest	USFS	VT	4,800	7.5	1,900	19	June 19, 1984
Gibraltar Mountain	Arizona BLM Colorado River District	BLM	AZ	18,790	29.36	7,600	76.0	November 28, 1990
Gila	Gila National Forest	USFS	NM	558,014	871.897	225,820	2,258.20	September 3, 1964
Glacier Bay	Glacier Bay National Park	NPS	AK	2,664,876	4,163.869	1,078,437	10,784.37	December 2, 1980
Glacier Peak	Wenatchee National Forest, Mount Baker–Snoqualmie National Forest	USFS	WA	566,057	884.464	229,075	2,290.75	September 3, 1964
Glacier View	Gifford Pinchot National Forest	USFS	WA	3,073	4.802	1,244	12.44	July 3, 1984
Glastenbury	Green Mountain National Forest	USFS	VT	22,539	35.217	9,121	91.21	December 1, 2006
Goat Rocks	Gifford Pinchot National Forest, Mount Baker–Snoqualmie National Forest	USFS	WA	108,096	168.900	43,745	437.45	September 3, 1964
Golden Trout	Inyo National Forest, Sequoia National Forest	USFS	CA	303,511	474.236	122,827	1,228.27	February 24, 1978
Golden Valley	California BLM California Desert District	BLM	CA	37,786	59.041	15,291	152.91	October 31, 1994
Goose Creek	Utah BLM Color Country District	BLM	UT	93	0.145	38	0.38	March 30, 2009
Goshute Canyon	Nevada BLM Ely District	BLM	NV	42,544	66.475	17,217	172.17	December 20, 2006
Gospel Hump	Nez Perce National Forest	USFS	ID	205,796	321.556	83,283	832.83	February 24, 1978
Government Peak	Nevada BLM Ely District	BLM	NV	6,313	9.864	2,555	25.55	December 20, 2006
Grand Wash Cliffs	Grand Canyon-Parashant National Monument	BLM	AZ	37,030	57.86	14,990	149.9	August 28, 1984
Granite Chief	Tahoe National Forest	USFS	CA	25,079	39.186	10,149	101.49	September 28, 1984
Granite Mountain	Prescott National Forest	USFS	AZ	40,821	63.783	16,520	165.20	August 28, 1984
Granite Mountain	California BLM Central California District	BLM	CA	31,059	48.530	12,569	125.69	March 30, 2009
Grant Range	Humboldt–Toiyabe National Forest	USFS	NV	52,600	82.2	21,300	213	December 5, 1989
Grass Valley	California BLM California Desert District	BLM	CA	30,121	47.064	12,190	121.90	October 31, 1994
Grassy Knob	Rogue River–Siskiyou National Forest	USFS	OR	17,159	26.811	6,944	69.44	June 26, 1984
Great Bear	Flathead National Forest	USFS	MT	286,700	448.0	116,000	1,160	October 28, 1978
Great Falls Basin	California BLM California Desert District	BLM	CA	7,810	12.20	3,160	31.6	March 12, 2019
Great Gulf	White Mountain National Forest	USFS	NH	5,658	8.841	2,290	22.90	September 3, 1964
Great Sand Dunes	Great Sand Dunes National Park	NPS	CO	32,643	51.005	13,210	132.10	October 20, 1976
Great Swamp National Wildlife Refuge	Great Swamp National Wildlife Refuge	FWS	NJ	3,660	5.72	1,480	14.8	September 28, 1968
Greenhorn Mountain	San Isabel National Forest, Pike National Forest	USFS	CO	23,087	36.073	9,343	93.43	August 13, 1993
Gros Ventre	Bridger-Teton National Forest	USFS	WY	317,874	496.678	128,639	1,286.39	October 30, 1984
Guadalupe Mountains National Park	Guadalupe Mountains National Park	NPS	TX	46,850	73.20	18,960	189.6	November 10, 1978
Gulf Islands	Gulf Islands National Seashore	NPS	MS	4,080	6.38	1,650	16.5	November 10, 1978
Gunnison Gorge	Gunnison Gorge National Conservation Area	BLM	CO	17,784	27.788	7,197	71.97	October 21, 1999
Hain	Pinnacles National Park	NPS	CA	15,985	24.977	6,469	64.69	October 20, 1976
Haleakala	Haleakalā National Park	NPS	HI	24,719	38.623	10,003	100.03	October 20, 1976
Harcuvar Mountains	Arizona BLM Colorado River District	BLM	AZ	25,050	39.14	10,140	101.4	November 28, 1990
Harquahala Mountains	Arizona BLM Phoenix District	BLM	AZ	22,880	35.75	9,260	92.6	November 28, 1990
Hassayampa River Canyon	Arizona BLM Phoenix District	BLM	AZ	12,300	19.2	5,000	50	November 28, 1990
Hauser	Cleveland National Forest	USFS	CA	25,348	39.606	10,258	102.58	September 28, 1984
Havasu	Havasu National Wildlife Refuge	FWS	AZ, CA	17,801	27.814	7,204	72.04	November 28, 1990
Hawaii Volcanoes	Hawaiʻi Volcanoes National Park	NPS	HI	130,790	204.36	52,930	529.3	November 10, 1978
Hazy Islands	Alaska Maritime National Wildlife Refuge	FWS	AK	32	0.050	13	0.13	October 23, 1970
Headwaters	Chequamegon-Nicolet National Forest	USFS	WI	22,033	34.427	8,916	89.16	June 19, 1984
Hell Hole Bay	Francis Marion National Forest	USFS	SC	2,125	3.320	860	8.60	December 22, 1980
Hells Canyon	Arizona BLM Phoenix District	BLM	AZ	9,951	15.548	4,027	40.27	November 28, 1990
Hells Canyon	Wallowa National Forest, Nez Perce National Forest, Payette National Forest, Whitman National Forest, Oregon-Washington BLM Vale District	USFS, BLM	OR, ID	227,970	356.20	92,260	922.6	December 31, 1975
Hellsgate	Tonto National Forest	USFS	AZ	37,440	58.50	15,150	151.5	August 28, 1984
Hemingway–Boulders	Sawtooth National Forest	USFS	ID	67,998	106.247	27,518	275.18	August 7, 2015
Henry M. Jackson	Wenatchee National Forest, Snoqualmie National Forest, Mount Baker National Forest	USFS	WA	103,297	161.402	41,803	418.03	July 3, 1984
Hercules Glades	Mark Twain National Forest	USFS	MO	11,909	18.608	4,819	48.19	October 19, 1976
Hermosa Creek	San Juan National Forest	USFS	CO	37,236	58.181	15,069	150.69	December 10, 2014
Hickory Creek	Allegheny National Forest	USFS	PA	8,630	13.48	3,490	34.9	October 30, 1984
High Rock Canyon	California BLM Northern California District	BLM	NV	46,465	72.602	18,804	188.04	December 21, 2000
High Rock Lake	Nevada BLM Winnemucca District	BLM	NV	59,107	92.355	23,920	239.20	December 21, 2000
High Schells	Humboldt-Toiyabe National Forest	USFS	NV	121,497	189.839	49,168	491.68	December 20, 2006
High Uintas	Ashley National Forest, Uinta-Wasatch-Cache National Forest	USFS	UT	456,705	713.602	184,822	1,848.22	September 28, 1984
Highland Ridge	Nevada BLM Ely District	BLM	NV	68,623	107.223	27,771	277.71	December 20, 2006
Hollow Hills	California BLM California Desert District	BLM	CA	22,366	34.947	9,051	90.51	October 31, 1994
Holy Cross	San Isabel National Forest, White River National Forest	USFS	CO	122,918	192.059	49,743	497.43	December 22, 1980
Hoover	Inyo National Forest, Humboldt-Toiyabe National Forest	USFS	CA	124,468	194.481	50,370	503.70	September 3, 1964
Horse Valley	Utah BLM Green River District	BLM	UT	12,201	19.064	4,938	49.38	March 12, 2019
Horseshoe Bay	Hiawatha National Forest	USFS	MI	3,782	5.909	1,531	15.31	December 8, 1987
Hummingbird Springs	Arizona BLM Phoenix District	BLM	AZ	31,200	48.8	12,600	126	November 28, 1990
Hunter–Fryingpan	White River National Forest	USFS	CO	82,026	128.166	33,195	331.95	February 24, 1978
Hunting Camp Creek	George Washington and Jefferson National Forests	USFS	VA	8,470	13.23	3,430	34.3	March 30, 2009
Huron Islands	Seney National Wildlife Refuge	FWS	MI	147	0.230	59	0.59	October 23, 1970
Hurricane Creek	Ozark-St. Francis National Forest	USFS	AR	15,307	23.917	6,195	61.95	October 19, 1984
Huston Park	Medicine Bow National Forest	USFS	WY	30,588	47.794	12,379	123.79	October 30, 1984
Ibex	California BLM California Desert District	BLM	CA	28,822	45.034	11,664	116.64	October 31, 1994
Imperial Refuge	Imperial National Wildlife Refuge	FWS	AZ, CA	15,056	23.525	6,093	60.93	November 28, 1990
Indian Heaven	Gifford Pinchot National Forest	USFS	WA	20,782	32.472	8,410	84.10	July 3, 1984
Indian Mounds	Sabine National Forest	USFS	TX	12,369	19.327	5,006	50.06	October 30, 1984
Indian Pass	California BLM California Desert District	BLM	CA	43,279	67.623	17,514	175.14	October 31, 1994
Indian Peaks	Arapaho and Roosevelt National Forests, Rocky Mountain National Park	USFS, NPS	CO	76,711	119.861	31,044	310.44	October 11, 1978
Innoko	Innoko National Wildlife Refuge	FWS	AK	1,240,000	1,940	500,000	5,000	December 2, 1980
Inyo Mountains	Inyo National Forest, California BLM Central California District	USFS, BLM	CA	198,375	309.961	80,280	802.80	October 31, 1994
Ireteba	Lake Mead National Recreation Area	NPS, BLM	NV	32,631	50.986	13,205	132.05	November 6, 2002
Irish	Mark Twain National Forest	USFS	MO	16,362	25.566	6,621	66.21	May 21, 1984
Ishi	Lassen National Forest	USFS	CA	41,946	65.541	16,975	169.75	September 28, 1984
Island Bay	Island Bay National Wildlife Refuge	FWS	FL	20	0.031	8.1	0.081	October 23, 1970
Isle Royale	Isle Royale National Park	NPS	MI	132,018	206.278	53,426	534.26	October 20, 1976
Izembek	Izembek National Wildlife Refuge	FWS	AK	307,982	481.222	124,636	1,246.36	December 2, 1980
J.N. "Ding" Darling	J.N. "Ding" Darling National Wildlife Refuge	FWS	FL	2,619	4.092	1,060	10.60	October 19, 1976
Jacumba	California BLM California Desert District	BLM	CA	31,358	48.997	12,690	126.90	October 31, 1994
James Peak	Arapaho National Forest, Roosevelt National Forest	USFS	CO	17,015	26.586	6,886	68.86	August 21, 2002
James River Face	George Washington and Jefferson National Forests	USFS	VA	8,886	13.884	3,596	35.96	January 3, 1975
Jarbidge	Humboldt-Toiyabe National Forest	USFS	NV	111,087	173.573	44,955	449.55	September 3, 1964
Jay S. Hammond	Lake Clark National Park and Preserve	NPS	AK	2,619,550	4,093.05	1,060,090	10,600.9	December 2, 1980
Jedediah Smith	Caribou-Targhee National Forest	USFS	WY	123,451	192.892	49,959	499.59	October 30, 1984
Jennie Lakes	Sequoia National Forest	USFS	CA	10,289	16.077	4,164	41.64	September 28, 1984
Jim McClure–Jerry Peak	Salmon-Challis National Forest	USFS	ID	116,986	182.791	47,343	473.43	August 7, 2015
Jimbilnan	Lake Mead National Recreation Area	NPS	NV	18,879	29.498	7,640	76.40	November 6, 2002
John Krebs	Sequoia National Park	NPS	CA	39,967	62.448	16,174	161.74	March 30, 2009
John Muir	Sierra National Forest, Inyo National Forest	USFS	CA	651,992	1,018.738	263,852	2,638.52	September 3, 1964
Joseph Battell	Green Mountain National Forest	USFS	VT	12,336	19.275	4,992	49.92	December 1, 2006
Joshua Tree	Joshua Tree National Park	NPS	CA	594,502	928.909	240,586	2,405.86	October 20, 1976
Joyce Kilmer-Slickrock	Nantahala National Forest, Cherokee National Forest	USFS	NC, TN	19,246	30.072	7,789	77.89	January 3, 1975
Jumbo Springs	Nevada BLM Southern Nevada District	BLM	NV	4,760	7.44	1,930	19.3	November 6, 2002
Juniper Dunes	Oregon-Washington BLM Spokane District	BLM	WA	7,140	11.16	2,890	28.9	July 3, 1984
Juniper Mesa	Prescott National Forest	USFS	AZ	7,406	11.572	2,997	29.97	August 28, 1984
Juniper Prairie	Ocala National Forest	USFS	FL	14,277	22.308	5,778	57.78	September 28, 1984
Kachina Peaks	Coconino National Forest	USFS	AZ	18,616	29.088	7,534	75.34	August 28, 1984
Kaiser	Sierra National Forest	USFS	CA	22,700	35.5	9,200	92	October 19, 1976
Kalmiopsis	Rogue River-Siskiyou National Forest	USFS	OR	180,095	281.398	72,882	728.82	September 3, 1964
Kanab Creek	Kaibab National Forest	USFS	AZ	70,460	110.09	28,510	285.1	August 28, 1984
Karta River	Tongass National Forest	USFS	AK	39,889	62.327	16,143	161.43	November 28, 1990
Katmai	Katmai National Park	NPS	AK	3,384,358	5,288.059	1,369,601	13,696.01	December 2, 1980
Kelso Dunes	California BLM California Desert District	BLM	CA	144,915	226.430	58,645	586.45	October 31, 1994
Kenai	Kenai National Wildlife Refuge	FWS	AK	1,354,247	2,116.011	548,044	5,480.44	December 2, 1980
Kendrick Mountain	Coconino National Forest, Kaibab National Forest	USFS	AZ	6,510	10.17	2,630	26.3	August 28, 1984
Kiavah	Sequoia National Forest, California BLM Central California District	USFS, BLM	CA	40,960	64.00	16,580	165.8	October 31, 1994
Kimberling Creek	George Washington and Jefferson National Forests	USFS	VA	5,805	9.070	2,349	23.49	October 30, 1984
King Range	California BLM Northern California District	BLM	CA	42,695	66.711	17,278	172.78	October 17, 2006
Kingston Range	California BLM California Desert District	BLM	CA	252,149	393.983	102,041	1,020.41	October 31, 1994
Kisatchie Hills	Kisatchie National Forest	USFS	LA	8,679	13.561	3,512	35.12	December 22, 1980
Kobuk Valley	Kobuk Valley National Park	NPS	AK	174,545	272.727	70,636	706.36	December 2, 1980
Kofa	Kofa National Wildlife Refuge	FWS	AZ	516,200	806.6	208,900	2,089	November 28, 1990
Kootznoowoo	Admiralty Island National Monument	USFS	AK	956,255	1,494.148	386,983	3,869.83	December 2, 1980
Koyukuk	Koyukuk National Wildlife Refuge	FWS	AK	400,000	620	160,000	1,600	December 2, 1980
Kuiu	Tongass National Forest	USFS	AK	60,581	94.658	24,516	245.16	November 28, 1990
La Garita	Gunnison National Forest, Rio Grande National Forest	USFS	CO	129,626	202.541	52,458	524.58	September 3, 1964
La Madre Mountain	Humboldt-Toiyabe National Forest, Nevada BLM Southern Nevada District	USFS, BLM	NV	47,296	73.900	19,140	191.40	November 6, 2002
Labyrinth Canyon Wilderness	Utah BLM Green River District	BLM	UT	54,643	85.380	22,113	221.13	March 12, 2019
Lacassine	Lacassine National Wildlife Refuge	FWS	LA	3,346	5.228	1,354	13.54	October 19, 1976
Lake Chelan-Sawtooth	Okanogan–Wenatchee National Forest	USFS	WA	153,057	239.152	61,940	619.40	July 3, 1984
Lake Woodruff	Lake Woodruff National Wildlife Refuge	FWS	FL	1,066	1.666	431	4.31	October 19, 1976
Lassen Volcanic	Lassen Volcanic National Park	NPS	CA	78,982	123.409	31,963	319.63	October 19, 1972
Latir Peak	Carson National Forest	USFS	NM	20,000	31	8,100	81	December 19, 1980
Laurel Fork North	Monongahela National Forest	USFS	WV	11,888	18.575	4,811	48.11	January 13, 1983
Laurel Fork South	Monongahela National Forest	USFS	WV	11,888	18.575	4,811	48.11	January 13, 1983
Lava Beds	Lava Beds National Monument	NPS	CA	28,460	44.47	11,520	115.2	October 13, 1972
LaVerkin Creek	Utah BLM Color Country District	BLM	UT	453	0.708	183	1.83	March 30, 2009
Leaf	De Soto National Forest	USFS	MS	994	1.553	402	4.02	October 19, 1984
Leatherwood	Ozark-St. Francis National Forest	USFS	AR	16,838	26.309	6,814	68.14	October 19, 1984
Lee Metcalf	Beaverhead-Deerlodge National Forest, Gallatin National Forest, Montana-Dakotas BLM Western Montana District	USFS, BLM	MT	254,635	397.867	103,047	1,030.47	October 31, 1983
Lewis Fork	George Washington and Jefferson National Forests	USFS	VA	5,926	9.259	2,398	23.98	October 30, 1984
Lime Canyon	Gold Butte National Monument	BLM	NV	23,710	37.05	9,600	96.0	November 6, 2002
Linville Gorge	Pisgah National Forest	USFS	NC	11,786	18.416	4,770	47.70	September 3, 1964
Little Chuckwalla Mountains	California BLM California Desert District	BLM	CA	28,044	43.819	11,349	113.49	October 31, 1994
Little Dry Run	Mount Rogers National Recreation Area	USFS	VA	2,858	4.466	1,157	11.57	October 30, 1984
Little Frog Mountain	Cherokee National Forest	USFS	TN	4,666	7.291	1,888	18.88	October 16, 1986
Little High Rock Canyon	Nevada BLM Winnemucca District	BLM	NV	48,355	75.555	19,569	195.69	December 21, 2000
Little Jacks Creek	Idaho BLM Boise District	BLM	ID	50,930	79.58	20,610	206.1	March 30, 2009
Little Lake Creek	Sam Houston National Forest	USFS	TX	3,855	6.023	1,560	15.60	October 30, 1984
Little Lake George	Ocala National Forest	USFS	FL	2,833	4.427	1,146	11.46	September 28, 1984
Little Ocean Draw	Utah BLM Green River District	BLM	UT	20,660	32.28	8,360	83.6	March 12, 2019
Little Picacho	California BLM California Desert District	BLM	CA	38,216	59.713	15,465	154.65	October 31, 1994
Little Wambaw Swamp	Francis Marion National Forest	USFS	SC	5,047	7.886	2,042	20.42	December 22, 1980
Little Wild Horse Canyon	Utah BLM Green River District	BLM	UT	5,479	8.561	2,217	22.17	March 12, 2019
Little Wilson Creek	Mount Rogers National Recreation Area	USFS	VA	5,458	8.528	2,209	22.09	October 30, 1984
Lizard Head	Uncompahgre National Forest, San Juan National Forest	USFS	CO	41,309	64.545	16,717	167.17	December 22, 1980
Lone Peak	Uinta-Wasatch-Cache National Forest	USFS	UT	30,088	47.013	12,176	121.76	February 24, 1978
Lost Creek	Pike National Forest	USFS	CO	119,790	187.17	48,480	484.8	December 22, 1980
Lostwood	Lostwood National Wildlife Refuge	FWS	ND	5,577	8.714	2,257	22.57	January 3, 1975
Lower Last Chance	Utah BLM Green River District	BLM	UT	19,339	30.217	7,826	78.26	March 12, 2019
Lower White River	Mt. Hood National Forest, Oregon-Washington BLM Prineville District	USFS, BLM	OR	2,806	4.384	1,136	11.36	March 30, 2009
Lusk Creek	Shawnee National Forest	USFS	IL	6,293	9.833	2,547	25.47	November 28, 1990
Lye Brook	Green Mountain National Forest	USFS	VT	18,122	28.316	7,334	73.34	January 3, 1975
Machesna Mountain	Los Padres National Forest, California BLM Central California District	USFS, BLM	CA	19,873	31.052	8,042	80.42	September 28, 1984
Mackinac	Hiawatha National Forest	USFS	MI	11,321	17.689	4,581	45.81	December 8, 1987
Magic Mountain	San Gabriel Mountains National Monument	USFS	CA	11,938	18.653	4,831	48.31	March 30, 2009
Malpais Mesa	California BLM California Desert District	BLM	CA	31,906	49.853	12,912	129.12	October 31, 1994
Manly Peak	California BLM California Desert District	BLM	CA	12,897	20.152	5,219	52.19	October 31, 1994
Manzano Mountain	Cibola National Forest	USFS	NM	36,875	57.617	14,923	149.23	February 24, 1978
Marble Mountain	Klamath National Forest	USFS	CA	241,744	377.725	97,830	978.30	September 3, 1964
Marjory Stoneman Douglas	Everglades National Park	NPS	FL	1,296,500	2,025.8	524,700	5,247	November 10, 1978
Mark O. Hatfield	Mount Hood National Forest	USFS	OR	65,822	102.847	26,637	266.37	June 26, 1984
Mark Trail	Chattahoochee National Forest	USFS	GA	16,400	25.6	6,600	66	December 11, 1991
Maroon Bells–Snowmass	Gunnison National Forest, White River National Forest	USFS	CO	181,602	283.753	73,492	734.92	September 3, 1964
Matilija	Los Padres National Forest	USFS	CA	29,600	46.3	12,000	120	June 19, 1992
Maurelle Islands	Tongass National Forest	USFS	AK	4,814	7.522	1,948	19.48	December 2, 1980
Mazatzal	Tonto National Forest, Coconino National Forest	USFS	AZ	252,390	394.36	102,140	1,021.4	September 3, 1964
McCormick	Ottawa National Forest	USFS	MI	16,914	26.428	6,845	68.45	December 8, 1987
Meadow Valley Range	Nevada BLM Ely District	BLM	NV	123,508	192.981	49,982	499.82	November 30, 2004
Mecca Hills	California BLM California Desert District	BLM	CA	26,243	41.005	10,620	106.20	October 31, 1994
Medicine Lake	Medicine Lake National Wildlife Refuge	FWS	MT	11,366	17.759	4,600	46.00	October 19, 1976
Menagerie	Willamette National Forest	USFS	OR	5,084	7.944	2,057	20.57	June 26, 1984
Mesa Verde	Mesa Verde National Park	NPS	CO	8,500	13.3	3,400	34	October 20, 1976
Mesquite	California BLM California Desert District	BLM	CA	44,804	70.006	18,132	181.32	October 31, 1994
Mexican Mountain	Utah BLM Green River District	BLM	UT	76,413	119.395	30,923	309.23	March 12, 2019
Michigan Islands	Michigan Islands National Wildlife Refuge	FWS	MI	12	0.019	4.9	0.049	October 23, 1970
Middle Prong	Pisgah National Forest	USFS	NC	7,460	11.66	3,020	30.2	June 19, 1984
Middle Santiam	Willamette National Forest	USFS	OR	8,900	13.9	3,600	36	June 26, 1984
Middle Wild Horse Mesa	Utah Blm Green River District	BLM	UT	16,343	25.536	6,614	66.14	March 12, 2019
Mill Creek	Ochoco National Forest	USFS	OR	17,323	27.067	7,010	70.10	June 26, 1984
Miller Peak	Coronado National Forest	USFS	AZ	20,228	31.606	8,186	81.86	August 28, 1984
Milpitas Wash	California BLM California Desert District	BLM	CA	17,250	26.95	6,980	69.8	March 12, 2019
Mingo	Mingo National Wildlife Refuge	FWS	MO	7,730	12.08	3,130	31.3	October 19, 1976
Mission Mountains	Flathead National Forest	USFS	MT	73,877	115.433	29,897	298.97	January 3, 1975
Misty Fjords National Monument	Misty Fjords National Monument	USFS	AK	2,142,657	3,347.902	867,103	8,671.03	December 2, 1980
Mojave	Mojave National Preserve	NPS	CA	695,200	1,086.2	281,300	2,813	October 31, 1994
Mokelumne	Stanislaus National Forest, Eldorado National Forest, Humboldt-Toiyabe National Forest	USFS	CA	99,268	155.106	40,172	401.72	September 3, 1964
Mollie Beattie	Arctic National Wildlife Refuge	FWS	AK	8,000,000	12,000	3,200,000	32,000	December 2, 1980
Monarch	Sequoia National Forest, Sierra National Forest	USFS	CA	44,896	70.150	18,169	181.69	September 28, 1984
Monomoy	Monomoy National Wildlife Refuge	FWS	MA	3,244	5.069	1,313	13.13	October 23, 1970
Monument Rock	Malheur National Forest, Wallowa-Whitman National Forest	USFS	OR	20,079	31.373	8,126	81.26	June 26, 1984
Moosehorn	Moosehorn National Wildlife Refuge	FWS	ME	2,712	4.238	1,098	10.98	October 23, 1970
Moosehorn (Baring Unit)	Moosehorn National Wildlife Refuge	FWS	ME	4,680	7.31	1,890	18.9	January 3, 1975
Mormon Mountains	Nevada BLM Ely District	BLM	NV	157,716	246.431	63,825	638.25	November 30, 2004
Mount Adams	Gifford Pinchot National Forest	USFS	WA	47,078	73.559	19,052	190.52	September 3, 1964
Mount Baker	Mount Baker National Forest	USFS	WA	119,989	187.483	48,558	485.58	July 3, 1984
Mount Baldy	Apache-Sitgreaves National Forest	USFS	AZ	7,079	11.061	2,865	28.65	October 23, 1970
Mount Evans	Arapaho National Forest, Pike National Forest	USFS	CO	74,401	116.252	30,109	301.09	December 22, 1980
Mount Grafton	Nevada BLM Ely District	BLM	NV	78,754	123.053	31,871	318.71	December 20, 2006
Mount Hood	Mount Hood National Forest	USFS	OR	63,177	98.714	25,567	255.67	September 3, 1964
Mount Jefferson	Deschutes National Forest, Willamette National Forest	USFS	OR	104,523	163.317	42,299	422.99	October 2, 1968
Mount Lassic	Six Rivers National Forest	USFS	CA	7,279	11.373	2,946	29.46	October 17, 2006
Mount Logan	Grand Canyon-Parashant National Monument	BLM	AZ	14,650	22.89	5,930	59.3	August 28, 1984
Mount Massive	San Isabel National Forest, Leadville National Fish Hatchery	USFS, FWS	CO	30,540	47.72	12,360	123.6	December 22, 1980
Mount Naomi	Uinta-Wasatch-Cache National Forest	USFS	UT	44,554	69.616	18,030	180.30	September 28, 1984
Mount Nebo	Uinta National Forest	USFS	UT	28,022	43.784	11,340	113.40	September 28, 1984
Mount Nutt	Arizona BLM Colorado River District	BLM	AZ	28,080	43.88	11,360	113.6	November 28, 1990
Mount Olympus	Wasatch-Cache National Forest	USFS	UT	15,300	23.9	6,200	62	September 28, 1984
Mount Rainier	Mount Rainier National Park	NPS	WA	228,480	357.00	92,460	924.6	November 16, 1988
Mount Riley	Organ Mountains-Desert Peaks National Monument	BLM	NM	8,382	13.097	3,392	33.92	March 12, 2019
Mount Skokomish	Olympic National Forest	USFS	WA	13,291	20.767	5,379	53.79	July 3, 1984
Mount Sneffels	Uncompahgre National Forest	USFS	CO	16,566	25.884	6,704	67.04	December 22, 1980
Mount Thielsen	Deschutes National Forest, Umpqua National Forest, Fremont-Winema National Forest	USFS	OR	54,914	85.803	22,223	222.23	June 26, 1984
Mount Timpanogos	Uinta-Wasatch-Cache National Forest	USFS	UT	10,518	16.434	4,256	42.56	September 28, 1984
Mount Tipton	Arizona BLM Colorado River District	BLM	AZ	31,380	49.03	12,700	127.0	November 28, 1990
Mount Trumbull	Grand Canyon-Parashant National Monument	BLM	AZ	7,880	12.31	3,190	31.9	August 28, 1984
Mount Washington	Willamette National Forest, Deschutes National Forest	USFS	OR	54,278	84.809	21,966	219.66	September 3, 1964
Mount Wilson	Arizona BLM Colorado River District	BLM	AZ	23,900	37.3	9,700	97	November 28, 1990
Mount Zirkel	Routt National Forest	USFS	CO	159,935	249.898	64,723	647.23	September 3, 1964
Mountain Lake	George Washington and Jefferson National Forests	USFS	VA	15,096	23.588	6,109	61.09	October 30, 1984
Mountain Lakes	Fremont-Winema National Forest	USFS	OR	23,071	36.048	9,337	93.37	September 3, 1964
Mt. Charleston	Humboldt-Toiyabe National Forest, Nevada BLM Southern Nevada District	USFS, BLM	NV	55,300	86.4	22,400	224	December 5, 1989
Mt. Irish	Nevada BLM Ely District	BLM	NV	28,274	44.178	11,442	114.42	November 30, 2004
Mt. Moriah	Humboldt-Toiyabe National Forest, Nevada BLM Ely District	USFS, BLM	NV	79,974	124.959	32,364	323.64	December 5, 1989
Mt. Rose	Humboldt-Toiyabe National Forest	USFS	NV	31,310	48.92	12,670	126.7	December 5, 1989
Mt. Shasta	Shasta-Trinity National Forest	USFS	CA	34,005	53.133	13,761	137.61	September 28, 1984
Mt. Wrightson	Coronado National Forest	USFS	AZ	25,260	39.47	10,220	102.2	August 28, 1984
Mud Swamp-New River	Apalachicola National Forest	USFS	FL	8,090	12.64	3,270	32.7	September 28, 1984
Muddy Creek	Utah BLM Green River District	BLM	UT	98,023	153.161	39,669	396.69	March 12, 2019
Muddy Mountains	Lake Mead National Recreation Area, Nevada BLM Southern Nevada District	NPS, BLM	NV	48,154	75.241	19,487	194.87	November 6, 2002
Muggins Mountain	Arizona BLM Colorado River District	BLM	AZ	7,711	12.048	3,121	31.21	November 28, 1990
Munds Mountain	Coconino National Forest	USFS	AZ	24,411	38.142	9,879	98.79	August 28, 1984
Needle's Eye	Arizona BLM Gila District	BLM	AZ	8,760	13.69	3,550	35.5	November 28, 1990
Nellis Wash	Lake Mead National Recreation Area	NPS	NV	16,423	25.661	6,646	66.46	November 6, 2002
Nelson Mountain	Manti-La Sal National Forest	USFS	UT	7,433	11.614	3,008	30.08	March 12, 2019
Neota	Roosevelt National Forest	USFS	CO	9,924	15.506	4,016	40.16	December 22, 1980
Never Summer	Arapaho National Forest	USFS	CO	21,090	32.95	8,530	85.3	December 22, 1980
New Water Mountains	Arizona BLM Colorado River District	BLM	AZ	24,600	38.4	10,000	100	November 28, 1990
Newberry Mountains	California BLM California Desert District	BLM	CA	26,102	40.784	10,563	105.63	October 31, 1994
Noatak	Noatak National Preserve	NPS	AK	5,765,427	9,008.480	2,333,186	23,331.86	December 2, 1980
Noisy-Diobsud	Mount Baker National Forest	USFS	WA	14,666	22.916	5,935	59.35	July 3, 1984
Nopah Range	California BLM California Desert District	BLM	CA	106,623	166.598	43,149	431.49	October 31, 1994
Nordhouse Dunes	Manistee National Forest	USFS	MI	3,285	5.133	1,329	13.29	December 8, 1987
Norse Peak	Snoqualmie National Forest	USFS	WA	52,315	81.742	21,171	211.71	July 3, 1984
North Absaroka	Shoshone National Forest	USFS	WY	350,488	547.638	141,837	1,418.37	September 3, 1964
North Algodones Dunes	California BLM California Desert District	BLM	CA	25,895	40.461	10,479	104.79	October 31, 1994
North Black Rock Range	Nevada BLM Winnemucca District	BLM	NV	30,648	47.888	12,403	124.03	December 21, 2000
North Fork	Six Rivers National Forest	USFS	CA	7,999	12.498	3,237	32.37	September 28, 1984
North Fork John Day	Umatilla National Forest, Wallowa-Whitman National Forest	USFS	OR	120,560	188.38	48,790	487.9	June 26, 1984
North Fork Owyhee	Idaho BLM Boise District	BLM	ID	43,391	67.798	17,560	175.60	March 30, 2009
North Fork Umatilla	Umatilla National Forest	USFS	OR	20,299	31.717	8,215	82.15	June 26, 1984
North Jackson Mountains	Nevada BLM Winnemucca District	BLM	NV	23,439	36.623	9,485	94.85	December 21, 2000
North Maricopa Mountains	Sonoran Desert National Monument	BLM	AZ	63,200	98.8	25,600	256	November 28, 1990
North McCullough	Sloan Canyon National Conservation Area	BLM	NV	14,779	23.092	5,981	59.81	November 6, 2002
North Mesquite Mountains	California BLM California Desert District	BLM	CA	28,955	45.242	11,718	117.18	October 31, 1994
North Santa Teresa	Arizona BLM Gila District	BLM	AZ	5,800	9.1	2,300	23	November 28, 1990
Nunivak	Yukon Delta National Wildlife Refuge	FWS	AK	600,000	940	240,000	2,400	December 2, 1980
Ojito	New Mexico BLM Albuquerque District	BLM	NM	11,183	17.473	4,526	45.26	October 6, 2006
Okefenokee	Okefenokee National Wildlife Refuge	FWS	GA	353,981	553.095	143,251	1,432.51	October 1, 1974
Old Woman Mountains	California BLM California Desert District	BLM	CA	163,731	255.830	66,260	662.60	October 31, 1994
Opal Creek	Willamette National Forest	USFS	OR	20,454	31.959	8,277	82.77	November 12, 1996
Oregon Badlands	Oregon-Washington BLM Prineville District Office	BLM	OR	29,537	46.152	11,953	119.53	March 30, 2009
Oregon Islands	Oregon Islands National Wildlife Refuge	FWS	OR	372	0.581	151	1.51	October 23, 1970
Organ Mountains	Organ Mountains-Desert Peaks National Monument	BLM	NM	19,916	31.119	8,060	80.60	March 12, 2019
Organ Pipe Cactus	Organ Pipe Cactus National Monument	NPS	AZ	312,600	488.4	126,500	1,265	November 10, 1978
Orocopia Mountains	California BLM California Desert District	BLM	CA	50,960	79.63	20,620	206.2	October 31, 1994
Otay Mountain	California BLM California Desert District	BLM	CA	16,893	26.395	6,836	68.36	December 9, 1999
Otis Pike Fire Island High Dune	Fire Island National Seashore	NPS	NY	1,380	2.16	560	5.6	December 23, 1980
Otter Creek	Monongahela National Forest	USFS	WV	20,706	32.353	8,379	83.79	January 3, 1975
Owens Peak	California BLM California Desert District	BLM	CA	73,796	115.306	29,864	298.64	October 31, 1994
Owens River Headwaters	Inyo National Forest	USFS	CA	14,726	23.009	5,959	59.59	March 30, 2009
Owyhee River	Idaho BLM Boise District	BLM	ID	267,137	417.402	108,107	1,081.07	March 30, 2009
Paddy Creek	Mark Twain National Forest	USFS	MO	7,035	10.992	2,847	28.47	January 3, 1983
Pahrump Valley	California BLM California Desert District	BLM	CA	73,726	115.197	29,836	298.36	October 31, 1994
Pahute Peak	Nevada BLM Winnemucca District	BLM	NV	56,890	88.89	23,020	230.2	December 21, 2000
Paiute	Grand Canyon-Parashant National Monument, Arizona BLM Arizona Strip District	BLM	AZ	87,900	137.3	35,600	356	August 28, 1984
Pajarita	Coronado National Forest	USFS	AZ	7,553	11.802	3,057	30.57	August 28, 1984
Palen-McCoy	California BLM California Desert District	BLM	CA	236,488	369.513	95,703	957.03	October 31, 1994
Palo Verde Mountains	California BLM California Desert District	BLM	CA	39,955	62.430	16,169	161.69	October 31, 1994
Panther Den	Shawnee National Forest	USFS	IL	821	1.283	332	3.32	November 28, 1990
Paria Canyon-Vermilion Cliffs	Vermilion Cliffs National Monument	BLM	AZ, UT	110,732	173.019	44,812	448.12	August 28, 1984
Parsnip Peak	Nevada BLM Ely District	BLM	NV	43,512	67.988	17,609	176.09	November 30, 2004
Pasayten	Okanogan–Wenatchee National Forest, Mount Baker National Forest	USFS	WA	531,539	830.530	215,106	2,151.06	October 2, 1968
Passage Key	Passage Key National Wildlife Refuge	FWS	FL	36	0.056	15	0.15	October 23, 1970
Pecos	Santa Fe National Forest, Carson National Forest	USFS	NM	223,333	348.958	90,380	903.80	September 3, 1964
Pelican Island	Pelican Island National Wildlife Refuge	FWS	FL	6	0.0094	2.4	0.024	October 23, 1970
Peloncillo Mountains	Arizona BLM Gila District	BLM	AZ	19,440	30.38	7,870	78.7	November 28, 1990
Pemigewasset	White Mountain National Forest	USFS	NH	46,018	71.903	18,623	186.23	June 19, 1984
Peru Peak	Green Mountain National Forest	USFS	VT	7,823	12.223	3,166	31.66	June 19, 1984
Peters Mountain	George Washington and Jefferson National Forests	USFS	VA	4,531	7.080	1,834	18.34	October 30, 1984
Petersburg Creek–Duncan Salt Chuck	Tongass National Forest	USFS	AK	46,849	73.202	18,959	189.59	December 2, 1980
Petrified Forest	Petrified Forest National Park	NPS	AZ	50,260	78.53	20,340	203.4	October 23, 1970
Phillip Burton	Point Reyes National Seashore	NPS	CA	27,315	42.680	11,054	110.54	October 18, 1976
Picacho Peak	California BLM California Desert District	BLM	CA	8,860	13.84	3,590	35.9	October 31, 1994
Pine Creek	Cleveland National Forest	USFS	CA	13,480	21.06	5,460	54.6	September 28, 1984
Pine Forest Range	Nevada BLM Winnemucca District	BLM	NV	24,015	37.523	9,719	97.19	December 12, 2014
Pine Mountain	Prescott National Forest	USFS	AZ	20,061	31.345	8,118	81.18	February 15, 1972
Pine Valley Mountain	Dixie National Forest	USFS	UT	50,232	78.488	20,328	203.28	September 28, 1984
Piney Creek	Mark Twain National Forest	USFS	MO	8,178	12.778	3,310	33.10	December 22, 1980
Pinto Mountains	California BLM California Desert District	BLM	CA	24,348	38.044	9,853	98.53	March 30, 2009
Pinto Valley	Lake Mead National Recreation Area	NPS	NV	39,173	61.208	15,853	158.53	November 6, 2002
Piper Mountain	California BLM California Desert District	BLM	CA	72,192	112.800	29,215	292.15	October 31, 1994
Piute Mountains	Mojave Trails National Monument	BLM	CA	48,080	75.13	19,460	194.6	October 31, 1994
Platte River	Medicine Bow-Routt National Forest	USFS	WY	23,492	36.706	9,507	95.07	October 30, 1984
Pleasant View Ridge	San Gabriel Mountains National Monument	USFS	CA	26,752	41.800	10,826	108.26	March 30, 2009
Pleasant/Lemesurier/Inian Islands	Tongass National Forest	USFS	AK	23,096	36.088	9,347	93.47	November 28, 1990
Pocosin	Croatan National Forest	USFS	NC	11,709	18.295	4,738	47.38	June 19, 1984
Pole Creek	Idaho BLM Boise District	BLM	ID	12,529	19.577	5,070	50.70	March 30, 2009
Pond Mountain	Cherokee National Forest	USFS	TN	6,890	10.77	2,790	27.9	October 16, 1986
Pond Pine	Croatan National Forest	USFS	NC	1,685	2.633	682	6.82	June 19, 1984
Popo Agie	Shoshone National Forest	USFS	WY	101,870	159.17	41,230	412.3	October 30, 1984
Porcupine Lake	Chequamegon-Nicolet National Forest	USFS	WI	4,073	6.364	1,648	16.48	June 19, 1984
Poteau Mountain	Ouachita National Forest	USFS	AR	11,299	17.655	4,573	45.73	October 19, 1984
Potrillo Mountains	Organ Mountains-Desert Peaks National Monument	BLM	NM	105,085	164.195	42,526	425.26	March 12, 2019
Powderhorn	Colorado BLM Rocky Mountain District, Gunnison National Forest	BLM, USFS	CO	61,915	96.742	25,056	250.56	August 13, 1993
Presidential Range-Dry River	White Mountain National Forest	USFS	NH	27,606	43.134	11,172	111.72	January 3, 1975
Priest	George Washington and Jefferson National Forests	USFS	VA	5,963	9.317	2,413	24.13	November 9, 2000
Ptarmigan Peak	White River National Forest, Medicine Bow-Routt National Forest	USFS	CO	12,760	19.94	5,160	51.6	August 13, 1993
Pusch Ridge	Coronado National Forest	USFS	AZ	56,933	88.958	23,040	230.40	February 24, 1978
Quinn Canyon	Humboldt-Toiyabe National Forest	USFS	NV	26,310	41.11	10,650	106.5	December 5, 1989
Raccoon Branch	Mount Rogers National Recreation Area	USFS	VA	4,223	6.598	1,709	17.09	March 30, 2009
Raggeds	White River National Forest, Gunnison National Forest	USFS	CO	65,393	102.177	26,464	264.64	December 22, 1980
Rainbow Lake	Chequamegon-Nicolet National Forest	USFS	WI	7,133	11.145	2,887	28.87	January 3, 1975
Rainbow Mountain	Spring Mountains National Recreation Area, Nevada BLM Southern Nevada District	USFS, BLM	NV	24,984	39.038	10,111	101.11	November 6, 2002
Ramseys Draft	George Washington and Jefferson National Forests	USFS	VA	6,518	10.184	2,638	26.38	October 30, 1984
Rattlesnake	Lolo National Forest	USFS	MT	32,976	51.525	13,345	133.45	October 19, 1980
Raven Cliffs	Chattahoochee National Forest	USFS	GA	9,115	14.242	3,689	36.89	October 27, 1986
Rawah	Roosevelt National Forest, Routt National Forest	USFS	CO	73,868	115.419	29,893	298.93	September 3, 1964
Rawhide Mountains	Arizona BLM Colorado River District	BLM	AZ	38,470	60.11	15,570	155.7	November 28, 1990
Red Butte	Utah BLM Color Country District	BLM	UT	1,535	2.398	621	6.21	March 30, 2009
Red Buttes	Klamath National Forest, Rogue River National Forest	USFS	CA, OR	20,133	31.458	8,148	81.48	June 26, 1984
Red Mountain	Humboldt-Toiyabe National Forest	USFS	NV	39,179	61.217	15,855	158.55	December 20, 2006
Red Mountain	Utah BLM Color Country District	BLM	UT	18,729	29.264	7,579	75.79	March 30, 2009
Red Rock Lakes	Red Rock Lakes National Wildlife Refuge	FWS	MT	32,350	50.55	13,090	130.9	October 19, 1976
Red Rock-Secret Mountain	Coconino National Forest	USFS	AZ	47,194	73.741	19,099	190.99	August 28, 1984
Red's Canyon	Utah BLM Green River District	BLM	UT	17,325	27.070	7,011	70.11	March 12, 2019
Redfield Canyon	Arizona BLM Gila District	BLM	AZ	6,600	10.3	2,700	27	November 28, 1990
Resting Spring Range	California BLM California Desert District	BLM	CA	76,312	119.238	30,882	308.82	October 31, 1994
Rice Valley	California BLM California Desert District	BLM	CA	41,777	65.277	16,907	169.07	October 31, 1994
Rich Hole	George Washington and Jefferson National Forests	USFS	VA	6,450	10.08	2,610	26.1	June 7, 1988
Rich Mountain	Chattahoochee National Forest	USFS	GA	9,476	14.806	3,835	38.35	October 27, 1986
Richland Creek	Ozark-St. Francis National Forest	USFS	AR	11,801	18.439	4,776	47.76	October 7, 1998
Rincon Mountain	Coronado National Forest	USFS	AZ	38,590	60.30	15,620	156.2	August 28, 1984
Rio San Antonio	Rio Grande del Norte National Monument	BLM	NM	8,120	12.69	3,290	32.9	March 12, 2019
Riverside Mountains	California BLM California Desert District	BLM	CA	24,004	37.506	9,714	97.14	October 31, 1994
Roaring Plains West	Monongahela National Forest	USFS	WV	6,794	10.616	2,749	27.49	March 30, 2009
Roaring River	Mount Hood National Forest	USFS	OR	36,768	57.450	14,879	148.79	March 30, 2009
Robledo Mountains	Organ Mountains-Desert Peaks National Monument	BLM	NM	16,776	26.213	6,789	67.89	March 12, 2019
Rock Creek	Siuslaw National Forest	USFS	OR	7,648	11.950	3,095	30.95	June 26, 1984
Rock River Canyon	Hiawatha National Forest	USFS	MI	4,678	7.309	1,893	18.93	December 8, 1987
Rockpile Mountain	Mark Twain National Forest	USFS	MO	4,238	6.622	1,715	17.15	December 22, 1980
Rocks and Islands	California BLM Northern California District	BLM	CA	6	0.0094	2.4	0.024	October 17, 2006
Rocky Mountain National Park	Rocky Mountain National Park	NPS	CO	249,339	389.592	100,904	1,009.04	March 30, 2009
Rodman Mountains	California BLM California Desert District	BLM	CA	34,264	53.538	13,866	138.66	October 31, 1994
Rogue–Umpqua Divide	Rogue River-Siskiyou National Forest, Umpqua National Forest	USFS	OR	35,701	55.783	14,448	144.48	June 26, 1984
Rough Mountain	George Washington and Jefferson National Forests	USFS	VA	9,300	14.5	3,800	38	June 7, 1988
Round Island	Hiawatha National Forest	USFS	MI	375	0.586	152	1.52	December 8, 1987
Ruby Mountains	Humboldt-Toiyabe National Forest	USFS	NV	93,090	145.45	37,670	376.7	December 5, 1989
Russell Fjord	Tongass National Forest	USFS	AK	348,701	544.845	141,114	1,411.14	December 2, 1980
Russian	Klamath National Forest	USFS	CA	12,000	19	4,900	49	September 28, 1984
Sabinoso	New Mexico BLM Farmington District	BLM	NM	29,855	46.648	12,082	120.82	March 30, 2009
Sacatar Trail	California BLM California Desert District	BLM	CA	50,451	78.830	20,417	204.17	October 31, 1994
Saddle Mountain	Kaibab National Forest	BLM	AZ	40,539	63.342	16,406	164.06	August 28, 1984
Saddle Peak Hills	California BLM California Desert District	BLM	CA	1,530	2.39	620	6.2	October 31, 1994
Saguaro	Saguaro National Park	NPS	AZ	70,905	110.789	28,694	286.94	October 20, 1976
Saint Lazaria	Alaska Maritime National Wildlife Refuge	FWS	AK	65	0.102	26	0.26	October 23, 1970
Saint Mary's	George Washington and Jefferson National Forests	USFS	VA	9,835	15.367	3,980	39.80	October 30, 1984
Salmo-Priest	Colville National Forest	USFS	WA	43,348	67.731	17,542	175.42	July 3, 1984
Salmon–Huckleberry	Mount Hood National Forest	USFS	OR	62,455	97.586	25,275	252.75	June 26, 1984
Salome	Tonto National Forest	USFS	AZ	18,531	28.955	7,499	74.99	August 28, 1984
Salt Creek	Bitter Lake National Wildlife Refuge	FWS	NM	9,621	15.033	3,893	38.93	October 23, 1970
Salt River Canyon	Tonto National Forest	USFS	AZ	32,101	50.158	12,991	129.91	August 28, 1984
Sampson Mountain	Cherokee National Forest	USFS	TN	10,822	16.909	4,380	43.80	October 16, 1986
San Gabriel	San Gabriel Mountains National Monument	USFS	CA	36,118	56.434	14,616	146.16	May 24, 1968
San Gorgonio	Sand to Snow National Monument	USFS, BLM	CA	104,389	163.108	42,245	422.45	September 3, 1964
San Jacinto	San Bernardino National Forest	USFS	CA	32,248	50.388	13,050	130.50	September 3, 1964
San Juan	San Juan Islands National Wildlife Refuge	FWS	WA	353	0.552	143	1.43	October 19, 1976
San Mateo Canyon	Cleveland National Forest	USFS	CA	38,484	60.131	15,574	155.74	September 28, 1984
San Pedro Parks	Santa Fe National Forest	USFS	NM	41,132	64.269	16,646	166.46	September 3, 1964
San Rafael	Los Padres National Forest	USFS	CA	197,380	308.41	79,880	798.8	March 21, 1968
San Rafael Reef	Utah BLM Green River District	BLM	UT	60,442	94.441	24,460	244.60	March 12, 2019
Sandia Mountain	Cibola National Forest	USFS	NM	37,877	59.183	15,328	153.28	February 24, 1978
Sandwich Range	White Mountain National Forest	USFS	NH	35,306	55.166	14,288	142.88	June 19, 1984
Sangre de Cristo	Great Sand Dunes National Preserve, San Isabel and Rio Grande National Forests	USFS, NPS	CO	220,803	345.005	89,356	893.56	August 13, 1993
Sanhedrin	Mendocino National Forest	USFS	CA	10,666	16.666	4,316	43.16	October 17, 2006
Santa Lucia	Los Padres National Forest, California BLM Central California District	BLM	CA	20,486	32.009	8,290	82.90	February 24, 1978
Santa Rosa	Santa Rosa and San Jacinto Mountains National Monument	BLM, USFS	CA	72,679	113.561	29,412	294.12	September 28, 1984
Santa Rosa-Paradise Peak	Humboldt-Toiyabe National Forest	USFS	NV	32,020	50.03	12,960	129.6	December 5, 1989
Santa Teresa	Coronado National Forest	USFS	AZ	26,780	41.84	10,840	108.4	August 28, 1984
Sarvis Creek	Medicine Bow-Routt National Forest	USFS	CO	44,556	69.619	18,031	180.31	August 13, 1993
Savage Run	Medicine Bow-Routt National Forest	USFS	WY	14,927	23.323	6,041	60.41	February 24, 1978
Sawtooth	Sawtooth National Recreation Area	USFS	ID	217,088	339.200	87,852	878.52	August 22, 1972
Sawtooth Mountains	California BLM California Desert District	BLM	CA	33,612	52.519	13,602	136.02	October 31, 1994
Scapegoat	Lewis and Clark National Forest, Helena National Forest, Lolo National Forest	USFS	MT	239,936	374.900	97,099	970.99	August 20, 1972
Selawik	Selawik National Wildlife Refuge	FWS	AK	240,000	380	97,000	970	December 2, 1980
Selway-Bitterroot	Bitterroot National Forest, Clearwater National Forest, Lolo National Forest, Nez Perce National Forest	USFS	ID, MT	1,340,557	2,094.620	542,504	5,425.04	September 3, 1964
Semidi	Alaska Maritime National Wildlife Refuge	FWS	AK	250,000	390	100,000	1,000	December 2, 1980
Seney	Seney National Wildlife Refuge	FWS	MI	25,150	39.30	10,180	101.8	October 23, 1970
Sequoia-Kings Canyon	Sequoia National Park, Kings Canyon National Park	NPS	CA	768,112	1,200.175	310,844	3,108.44	September 28, 1984
Sespe	Los Padres National Forest	USFS	CA	219,700	343.3	88,900	889	June 19, 1992
Shawvers Run	George Washington and Jefferson National Forests	USFS	VA	5,686	8.884	2,301	23.01	June 7, 1988
Sheep Mountain	San Gabriel Mountains National Monument	USFS	CA	42,160	65.88	17,060	170.6	September 28, 1984
Sheep Ridge	Croatan National Forest	USFS	NC	9,297	14.527	3,762	37.62	June 19, 1984
Sheephole Valley	Mojave Trails National Monument	BLM	CA	187,846	293.509	76,019	760.19	October 31, 1994
Shellback	Humboldt-Toiyabe National Forest	USFS	NV	36,143	56.473	14,627	146.27	December 20, 2006
Shenandoah	Shenandoah National Park	NPS	VA	79,579	124.342	32,204	322.04	October 20, 1976
Shining Rock	Pisgah National Forest	USFS	NC	18,483	28.880	7,480	74.80	September 3, 1964
Sid's Mountain	Utah Green River District	BLM	UT	49,130	76.77	19,880	198.8	March 12, 2019
Sierra Ancha	Tonto National Forest	USFS	AZ	20,850	32.58	8,440	84.4	September 3, 1964
Sierra de las Uvas	Organ Mountains-Desert Peaks National Monument	BLM	NM	11,114	17.366	4,498	44.98	March 12, 2019
Sierra Estrella	Arizona BLM Phoenix District	BLM	AZ	14,400	22.5	5,800	58	November 28, 1990
Signal Mountain	Arizona BLM Phoenix District	BLM	AZ	13,350	20.86	5,400	54.0	November 28, 1990
Silver Peak	Los Padres National Forest	USFS	CA	28,428	44.419	11,504	115.04	June 19, 1992
Simeonof	Alaska Maritime National Wildlife Refuge	FWS	AK	25,855	40.398	10,463	104.63	October 19, 1976
Sipsey	Bankhead National Forest	USFS	AL	24,922	38.941	10,086	100.86	January 3, 1975
Siskiyou	Rogue River-Siskiyou National Forest, Klamath National Forest, Six Rivers National Forest	USFS	CA	182,628	285.356	73,907	739.07	September 28, 1984
Sky Lakes	Rogue River-Siskiyou National Forest, Fremont-Winema National Forest	USFS	OR	113,849	177.889	46,073	460.73	June 26, 1984
Slaughter Creek	Utah BLM Color Country District	BLM	UT	4,047	6.323	1,638	16.38	March 30, 2009
Sleeping Bear Dunes	Sleeping Bear Dunes National Lakeshore	NPS	MI	32,557	50.870	13,175	131.75	March 13, 2014
Snow Mountain	Berryessa Snow Mountain National Monument	USFS	CA	60,077	93.870	24,312	243.12	September 28, 1984
Soda Mountain	Cascade-Siskiyou National Monument	BLM	OR	80,090	125.14	32,410	324.1	March 30, 2009
Soda Mountains	California BLM California Desert District	BLM	CA	80,090	125.14	32,410	324.1	March 12, 2019
Soldier Creek	Nebraska National Forest	USFS	NE	7,794	12.178	3,154	31.54	January 21, 1986
South Baranof	Tongass National Forest	USFS	AK	319,568	499.325	129,325	1,293.25	December 2, 1980
South Egan Range	Nevada BLM Ely District	BLM	NV	67,214	105.022	27,201	272.01	December 20, 2006
South Etolin	Tongass National Forest	USFS	AK	82,619	129.092	33,435	334.35	November 28, 1990
South Fork Eel River	California BLM Northern California District	BLM	CA	12,868	20.106	5,207	52.07	October 17, 2006
South Fork San Jacinto	San Bernardino National Forest	USFS	CA	20,217	31.589	8,182	81.82	March 30, 2009
South Jackson Mountains	Nevada BLM Winnemucca District	BLM	NV	54,536	85.213	22,070	220.70	December 21, 2000
South Maricopa Mountains	Sonoran Desert National Monument	BLM	AZ	60,100	93.9	24,300	243	November 28, 1990
South McCullough	Nevada BLM Southern Nevada District	BLM	NV	43,996	68.744	17,805	178.05	November 6, 2002
South Nopah Range	California BLM California Desert District	BLM	CA	17,059	26.655	6,904	69.04	October 31, 1994
South Pahroc Range	Nevada BLM Ely District	BLM	NV	25,671	40.111	10,389	103.89	November 30, 2004
South Prince of Wales	Tongass National Forest	USFS	AK	90,968	142.138	36,813	368.13	December 2, 1980
South San Juan	San Juan National Forest	USFS	CO	158,790	248.11	64,260	642.6	December 22, 1980
South Sierra	Sequoia National Forest, Inyo National Forest	USFS	CA	60,084	93.881	24,315	243.15	September 28, 1984
South Warner	Modoc National Forest	USFS	CA	70,614	110.334	28,576	285.76	September 3, 1964
Southern Nantahala	Chattahoochee National Forest, Nantahala National Forest	USFS	GA	23,473	36.677	9,499	94.99	June 19, 1984
Spanish Peaks	San Isabel National Forest	USFS	CO	19,226	30.041	7,780	77.80	November 7, 2000
Spice Run	Monongahela National Forest	USFS	WV	6,037	9.433	2,443	24.43	March 30, 2009
Spirit Mountain	Lake Mead National Recreation Area, Nevada BLM Southern Nevada District	NPS, BLM	NV	33,466	52.291	13,543	135.43	November 6, 2002
Spring Basin	Oregon-Washington BLM Prineville District	BLM	OR	6,382	9.972	2,583	25.83	March 30, 2009
St. Marks	St. Marks National Wildlife Refuge	FWS	FL	17,350	27.11	7,020	70.2	January 3, 1975
Stateline	California BLM California Desert District	BLM	CA	6,964	10.881	2,818	28.18	October 31, 1994
Steens Mountain	Oregon-Washington BLM Burns District	BLM	OR	170,201	265.939	68,878	688.78	October 30, 2000
Stephen Mather	North Cascades National Park, Ross Lake National Recreation Area, Lake Chelan National Recreation Area	NPS	WA	634,614	991.584	256,819	2,568.19	November 16, 1988
Stepladder Mountains	California BLM California Desert District	BLM	CA	83,195	129.992	33,668	336.68	October 31, 1994
Stikine-LeConte	Tongass National Forest	USFS	AK	448,926	701.447	181,674	1,816.74	December 2, 1980
Stone Mountain	George Washington and Jefferson National Forests	USFS	VA	3,270	5.11	1,320	13.2	March 30, 2009
Strawberry Crater	Coconino National Forest	USFS	AZ	10,743	16.786	4,348	43.48	August 28, 1984
Strawberry Mountain	Malheur National Forest	USFS	OR	69,568	108.700	28,153	281.53	September 3, 1964
Sturgeon River Gorge	Ottawa National Forest	USFS	MI	16,728	26.138	6,770	67.70	December 8, 1987
Superstition	Tonto National Forest	USFS	AZ	159,757	249.620	64,651	646.51	September 3, 1964
Surprise Canyon	California BLM California Desert District	USFS	CA	24,433	38.177	9,888	98.88	October 31, 1994
Swanquarter	Swanquarter National Wildlife Refuge	FWS	NC	8,785	13.727	3,555	35.55	October 19, 1976
Swansea	Arizona BLM Colorado River District	BLM	AZ	16,400	25.6	6,600	66	November 28, 1990
Sycamore Canyon	Prescott National Forest, Coconino National Forest, Kaibab National Forest	USFS	AZ	55,937	87.402	22,637	226.37	March 6, 1972
Sylvania	Ottawa National Forest	USFS	MI	15,194	23.741	6,149	61.49	December 8, 1987
Sylvania Mountains	California BLM California Desert District	BLM	CA	18,682	29.191	7,560	75.60	October 31, 1994
Table Mountain	Humboldt-Toiyabe National Forest	USFS	NV	92,600	144.7	37,500	375	December 5, 1989
Table Rock	Oregon-Washington BLM Northwest Oregon District	BLM	OR	5,500	8.6	2,200	22	June 26, 1984
Table Top	Sonoran Desert National Monument	BLM	AZ	34,400	53.8	13,900	139	November 28, 1990
Tamarac	Tamarac National Wildlife Refuge	FWS	MN	2,180	3.41	880	8.8	October 19, 1976
Tatoosh	Gifford Pinchot National Forest	USFS	WA	15,725	24.570	6,364	63.64	July 3, 1984
Taylor Creek	Utah BLM Color Country District	BLM	UT	35	0.055	14	0.14	March 30, 2009
Tebenkof Bay	Tongass National Forest	USFS	AK	66,812	104.394	27,038	270.38	December 2, 1980
Teton	Bridger-Teton National Forest	USFS	WY	585,238	914.434	236,837	2,368.37	September 3, 1964
The Brothers	Olympic National Forest	USFS	WA	16,337	25.527	6,611	66.11	July 3, 1984
Theodore Roosevelt	Theodore Roosevelt National Park	NPS	ND	29,920	46.75	12,110	121.1	November 10, 1978
Thousand Lakes	Lassen National Forest	USFS	CA	16,335	25.523	6,611	66.11	September 3, 1964
Three Arch Rocks	Three Arch Rocks National Wildlife Refuge	FWS	OR	15	0.023	6.1	0.061	October 23, 1970
Three Ridges	George Washington and Jefferson National Forests	USFS	VA	4,608	7.200	1,865	18.65	November 9, 2000
Three Sisters	Willamette National Forest, Deschutes National Forest	USFS	OR	281,190	439.36	113,790	1,137.9	September 3, 1964
Thunder Ridge	George Washington and Jefferson National Forests	USFS	VA	2,344	3.663	949	9.49	October 30, 1984
Togiak	Togiak National Wildlife Refuge	FWS	AK	2,274,066	3,553.228	920,282	9,202.82	December 2, 1980
Tracy Arm-Fords Terror	Tongass National Forest	USFS	AK	653,179	1,020.592	264,332	2,643.32	December 2, 1980
Trapper Creek	Gifford Pinchot National Forest	USFS	WA	5,969	9.327	2,416	24.16	July 3, 1984
Tray Mountain	Chattahoochee National Forest	USFS	GA	9,702	15.159	3,926	39.26	October 27, 1986
Tres Alamos	Arizona BLM Colorado River District	BLM	AZ	8,300	13.0	3,400	34	November 28, 1990
Trigo Mountain	Arizona BLM Colorado River District	BLM	AZ	30,300	47.3	12,300	123	November 28, 1990
Trilobite	Mojave Trails National Monument	BLM	CA	37,308	58.294	15,098	150.98	October 31, 1994
Trinity Alps	Shasta-Trinity National Forest, Klamath National Forest, Six Rivers National Forest, California BLM Northern California District	USFS, BLM	CA	525,636	821.306	212,717	2,127.17	September 28, 1984
Tunnel Spring	Nevada BLM Ely District	BLM	NV	5,341	8.345	2,161	21.61	November 30, 2004
Turkey Hill	Angelina National Forest	USFS	TX	5,473	8.552	2,215	22.15	October 30, 1984
Turtle Canyon	Utah BLM Green River District	BLM	UT	29,029	45.358	11,748	117.48	March 12, 2019
Turtle Mountains	California BLM California Desert District	BLM	CA	177,309	277.045	71,754	717.54	October 31, 1994
Tuxedni Wilderness	Alaska Maritime National Wildlife Refuge	FWS	AK	5,566	8.697	2,252	22.52	October 23, 1970
Twin Peaks	Uinta-Wasatch-Cache National Forest	USFS	UT	11,396	17.806	4,612	46.12	September 28, 1984
UL Bend	UL Bend National Wildlife Refuge, Charles M. Russell National Wildlife Refuge	FWS	MT	20,819	32.530	8,425	84.25	October 19, 1976
Unaka Mountain	Cherokee National Forest	USFS	TN	4,496	7.025	1,819	18.19	October 16, 1986
Uncompahgre	Uncompahgre National Forest	USFS	CO	102,721	160.502	41,570	415.70	August 13, 1993
Unimak	Alaska Maritime National Wildlife Refuge	FWS	AK	910,000	1,420	370,000	3,700	December 2, 1980
Upland Island	Angelina National Forest	USFS	TX	13,331	20.830	5,395	53.95	October 29, 1986
Upper Bald River	Cherokee National Forest	USFS	TN	9,038	14.122	3,658	36.58	December 12, 2018
Upper Buffalo	Ozark-St. Francis National Forest	USFS	AR	12,018	18.778	4,864	48.64	January 3, 1975
Upper Burro Creek	Arizona BLM Colorado River District	BLM	AZ	27,440	42.88	11,100	111.0	November 28, 1990
Upper Kiamichi River	Ouachita National Forest	USFS	OK	9,754	15.241	3,947	39.47	October 18, 1988
Vasquez Peak	Arapaho National Forest, Roosevelt National Forest	USFS	CO	12,300	19.2	5,000	50	August 13, 1993
Ventana	Los Padres National Forest	USFS	CA	234,004	365.631	94,698	946.98	February 24, 1978
Wabayuma Peak	Arizona BLM Colorado River District	BLM	AZ	38,944	60.850	15,760	157.60	November 28, 1990
Waldo Lake	Willamette National Forest	USFS	OR	36,572	57.144	14,800	148.00	June 26, 1984
Wambaw Creek	Francis Marion National Forest	USFS	SC	1,825	2.852	739	7.39	December 22, 1980
Wambaw Swamp	Francis Marion National Forest	USFS	SC	4,815	7.523	1,949	19.49	December 22, 1980
Warm Springs	Arizona BLM Colorado River District	BLM	AZ	112,400	175.6	45,500	455	November 28, 1990
Warren Island	Tongass National Forest	USFS	AK	11,181	17.470	4,525	45.25	December 2, 1980
Washakie	Shoshone National Forest	USFS	WY	704,274	1,100.428	285,010	2,850.10	September 3, 1964
Washington Islands	Flattery Rocks National Wildlife Refuge, Quillayute Needles National Wildlife Refuge, Copalis National Wildlife Refuge	FWS	WA	452	0.706	183	1.83	October 23, 1970
Wee Thump Joshua Tree	Nevada BLM Southern Nevada District	BLM	NV	6,489	10.139	2,626	26.26	November 6, 2002
Weepah Spring	Nevada BLM Ely District	BLM	NV	51,305	80.164	20,762	207.62	November 30, 2004
Welcome Creek	Lolo National Forest	USFS	MT	28,135	43.961	11,386	113.86	February 24, 1978
Wellsville Mountain	Uinta-Wasatch-Cache National Forest	USFS	UT	20,988	32.794	8,494	84.94	September 28, 1984
Weminuche	San Juan National Forest, Rio Grande National Forest	USFS	CO	488,340	763.03	197,620	1,976.2	January 3, 1975
Wenaha–Tucannon	Umatilla National Forest	USFS	OR, WA	176,737	276.152	71,523	715.23	February 24, 1978
West Chichagof-Yakobi	Tongass National Forest	USFS	AK	265,286	414.509	107,357	1,073.57	December 2, 1980
West Clear Creek	Coconino National Forest	USFS	AZ	15,238	23.809	6,167	61.67	August 28, 1984
West Elk	Gunnison National Forest	USFS	CO	176,412	275.644	71,391	713.91	September 3, 1964
West Malpais	El Malpais National Conservation Area	BLM	NM	39,540	61.78	16,000	160.0	December 31, 1987
West Sister Island	West Sister Island National Wildlife Refuge	FWS	OH	77	0.120	31	0.31	January 3, 1975
Wet Beaver	Coconino National Forest	USFS	AZ	6,155	9.617	2,491	24.91	August 28, 1984
Wheeler Peak	Carson National Forest	USFS	NM	18,897	29.527	7,647	76.47	September 3, 1964
Whipple Mountains	California BLM California Desert District	BLM	CA	76,123	118.942	30,806	308.06	October 31, 1994
Whisker Lake	Chequamegon-Nicolet National Forest	USFS	WI	7,267	11.355	2,941	29.41	October 21, 1978
White Canyon	Arizona BLM Gila District	BLM	AZ	5,800	9.1	2,300	23	November 28, 1990
White Mountain	Lincoln National Forest	USFS	NM	72,428	113.169	29,311	293.11	September 3, 1964
White Mountains	Inyo National Forest, California BLM California Desert District	USFS, BLM	CA	206,796	323.119	83,687	836.87	March 30, 2009
White Pine Range	Humboldt-Toiyabe National Forest	USFS	NV	40,013	62.520	16,193	161.93	December 20, 2006
White Rock Range	Nevada BLM Ely District	BLM	NV	24,249	37.889	9,813	98.13	November 30, 2004
Whitethorn	Organ Mountains-Desert Peaks National Monument	BLM	NM	9,616	15.025	3,891	38.91	March 12, 2019
Wichita Mountains	Wichita Mountains Wildlife Refuge	FWS	OK	8,570	13.39	3,470	34.7	October 23, 1970
Wild River	White Mountain National Forest	USFS	NH	24,032	37.550	9,725	97.25	December 1, 2006
Wild Rogue	Rogue River-Siskiyou National Forest, Oregon-Washington BLM Medford District	USFS, BLM	OR	35,221	55.033	14,253	142.53	February 24, 1978
Wild Sky	Snoqualmie National Forest	USFS	WA	106,112	165.800	42,942	429.42	May 8, 2008
William O. Douglas	Gifford Pinchot National Forest, Wenatchee National Forest	USFS	WA	169,081	264.189	68,425	684.25	July 3, 1984
Winegar Hole	Caribou-Targhee National Forest	USFS	WY	10,715	16.742	4,336	43.36	October 30, 1984
Wisconsin Islands	Gravel Island National Wildlife Refuge, Green Bay National Wildlife Refuge	FWS	WI	29	0.045	12	0.12	October 23, 1970
Withington	Cibola National Forest	USFS	NM	19,000	30	7,700	77	December 19, 1980
Wolf Island	Wolf Island National Wildlife Refuge	FWS	GA	5,126	8.009	2,074	20.74	January 3, 1975
Wonder Mountain	Olympic National Forest	USFS	WA	2,200	3.4	890	8.9	July 3, 1984
Woodchute	Prescott National Forest	USFS	AZ	5,833	9.114	2,361	23.61	August 28, 1984
Woolsey Peak	Arizona BLM Phoenix District	BLM	AZ	64,000	100	26,000	260	November 28, 1990
Worthington Mountains	Basin and Range National Monument	BLM	NV	30,594	47.803	12,381	123.81	November 30, 2004
Wovoka	Humboldt-Toiyabe National Forest	USFS	NV	49,018	76.591	19,837	198.37	December 12, 2014
Wrangell–Saint Elias	Wrangell–St. Elias National Park and Preserve	NPS	AK	9,078,675	14,185.430	3,674,009	36,740.09	December 2, 1980
Yolla Bolly–Middle Eel	Mendocino National Forest, Shasta-Trinity National Forest, Six Rivers National Forest, California BLM Northern California District	USFS, BLM	CA	180,804	282.506	73,169	731.69	September 3, 1964
Yosemite	Yosemite National Park	NPS	CA	704,624	1,100.975	285,151	2,851.51	September 28, 1984
Yuki	Mendocino National Forest, California BLM Northern California District	USFS, BLM	CA	53,717	83.933	21,738	217.38	October 17, 2006
Zion	Zion National Park	NPS	UT	124,406	194.384	50,345	503.45	March 30, 2009

== See also ==
- Wilderness area
- List of national forests of the United States
- List of national parks of the United States
- National monument (United States)
- Intact forest landscape
