= Beauty Mountain Wilderness =

Protected area in California, US

Coordinates: 33.444°N 116.730°W

- IUCN category Ib (wilderness area)
- Location within California
- Location: California, U.S.
- Nearest city: Aguanga, California
- Area: 15,628 acres (63.24 km^{2})
- Established: 2009
- Governing body: Bureau of Land Management

Beauty Mountain Wilderness is a U.S. wilderness area in Riverside County, California. It consists of 15,628 acres (63.24 km^{2}) of very rugged and mountainous terrain. It is part of the Palm Springs - South Coast Field Office of the Bureau of Land Management, and was created by the Omnibus Public Land Management Act of 2009 from land already managed by the Bureau of Land Management.

Camping is allowed in the Wilderness Area, but only for 14 days. After this time, campers must move their site at least 25 miles (40 km) from the previous site. Pets are also allowed, but must be kept "under control". Any motorized vehicles are not allowed on Wilderness land.

== See also ==
- List of U.S. Wilderness Areas
