= Black Mountain Wilderness =

Protected wilderness area in California

- IUCN category Ib (wilderness area)
- Location within California Location within the United States
- Interactive map of Black Mountain Wilderness
- Location: San Bernardino County, California, United States
- Nearest city: Barstow, California
- Coordinates: 35.12405556°N 117.2120667°W
- Area: 20,548 acres (83 km^{2})
- Established: 1994
- Governing body: U.S. Department of Interior Bureau of Land Management

Black Mountain Wilderness is a protected wilderness area to the southwest of the Tiefort Mountains and Fort Irwin in the U.S. state of California. Established in 1994, the area is managed by the Bureau of Land Management.

The wilderness includes its namesake mesa Black Mountain in the northwestern section of the area, rising to an elevation of 3,941 feet (1201 m) from the Mojave Desert. Wildlife includes golden eagles and prairie falcons.

== See also ==
- List of U.S. Wilderness Areas
