= Whitethorn Wilderness =

Wilderness area

Broad Canyon Wilderness
- IUCN category Ib (wilderness area)
- Location within the United States
- Location: Doña Ana County, New Mexico and Luna County, New Mexico, USA
- Nearest city: Deming, NM
- Coordinates: 32.0658394°N 107.321034°W
- Area: 9,616 acres (39 km^{2})
- Established: 2019
- Governing body: U.S. Department of Interior Bureau of Land Management

Whitethorn Wilderness is a 9,616-acre (3,891ha) wilderness area in the Organ Mountains-Desert Peaks National Monument managed by the U.S. Bureau of Land Management in the U.S. state of New Mexico. Established in 2019, this Wilderness is located on the western end of the West Potrillo Mountains and named for the abundant Whitethorn acacia, a summer food source for the local population of desert mule deer. The ecosystem is typical of the Chihuahuan Desert.

== See also ==
- List of U.S. Wilderness Areas
