= Red Butte Wilderness =

Wilderness area in Utah, United States

- IUCN category Ib (wilderness area)
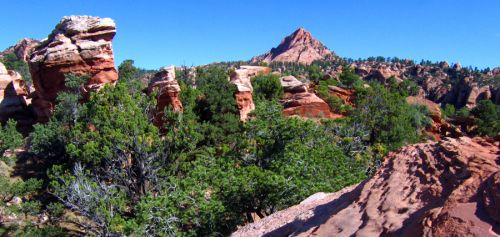
- Red Butte Wilderness

- Location within the United States
- Location: Washington County, Utah, USA
- Nearest city: Cedar City, UT
- Coordinates: 37°21′31″N 113°09′02″W
- Area: 1,537 acres (6.2 km^{2})
- Established: March 30, 2009
- Governing body: Bureau of Land Management

Red Butte Wilderness is a 1,537-acre (6.2 km^{2}) wilderness area in the US state of Utah. It was designated March 30, 2009, as part of the Omnibus Public Land Management Act of 2009. Located adjacent to Kolob Canyons section of Zion National Park, it encompasses and protects much of the 1,800-foot (550 m) Red Butte. Red Butte Wilderness is bordered by the Zion Wilderness to the north.

== See also ==
- List of U.S. Wilderness Areas

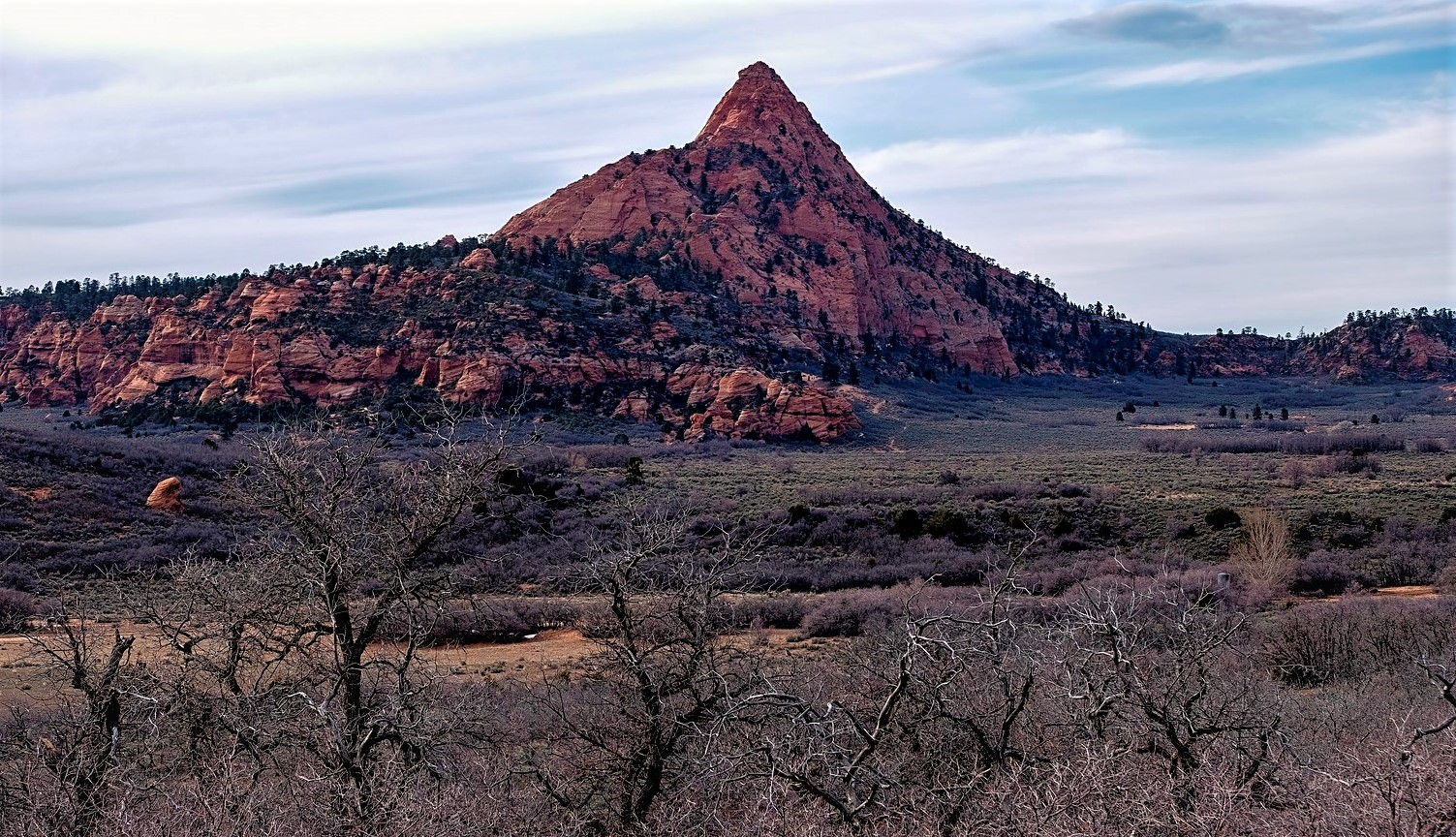
Red Butte
