= Cinder Cone Wilderness =

Protected area in New Mexico, US

- IUCN category Ib (wilderness area)
- Location within New Mexico Location within the United States
- Location: Doña Ana County, New Mexico, USA
- Nearest city: Las Cruces, NM
- Coordinates: 31.9391839°N 107.2065147°W
- Area: 16,935 acres (69 km^{2})
- Established: 2019
- Governing body: U.S. Department of Interior Bureau of Land Management

Cinder Cone Wilderness is a 16,935-acre (6,853 ha) wilderness area in the Organ Mountains-Desert Peaks National Monument managed by the U.S. Bureau of Land Management in the U.S. state of New Mexico. Established in 2019, this Wilderness located in the West Potrillo Mountains, contains a high concentration of cinder cones among a landscape typical of a Chihuahuan Desert ecosystem.

== See also ==
- List of U.S. Wilderness Areas
