= Mount Riley Wilderness =

Wilderness area in New Mexico, United States

- IUCN category Ib (wilderness area)
- Location within the United States
- Location: Doña Ana County, New Mexico, USA
- Nearest city: Las Cruces, NM
- Coordinates: 31.914562°N 107.0918198°W
- Area: 8,382 acres (34 km^{2})
- Established: 2019
- Governing body: U.S. Department of Interior Bureau of Land Management

Mount Riley Wilderness is an 8,382-acre (3,392 ha) wilderness area in the Organ Mountains-Desert Peaks National Monument managed by the U.S. Bureau of Land Management in the U.S. state of New Mexico. Established in 2019, this Wilderness located on the eastern end of the West Potrillo Mountains and bordering the nearby East Potrillo Mountains, contains three shield volcanoes that rise prominently from the Chihuahuan Desert floor. Cox Peak is the high point of the wilderness area and the Potrillo Mountain Complex at an elevation of 5,930 feet (1807 m), Mount Riley sits at 5,905 feet (1799 m).

== See also ==
- List of U.S. Wilderness Areas
