= Beartrap Canyon Wilderness =

Protected area in Utah, United States

- IUCN category Ib (wilderness area)
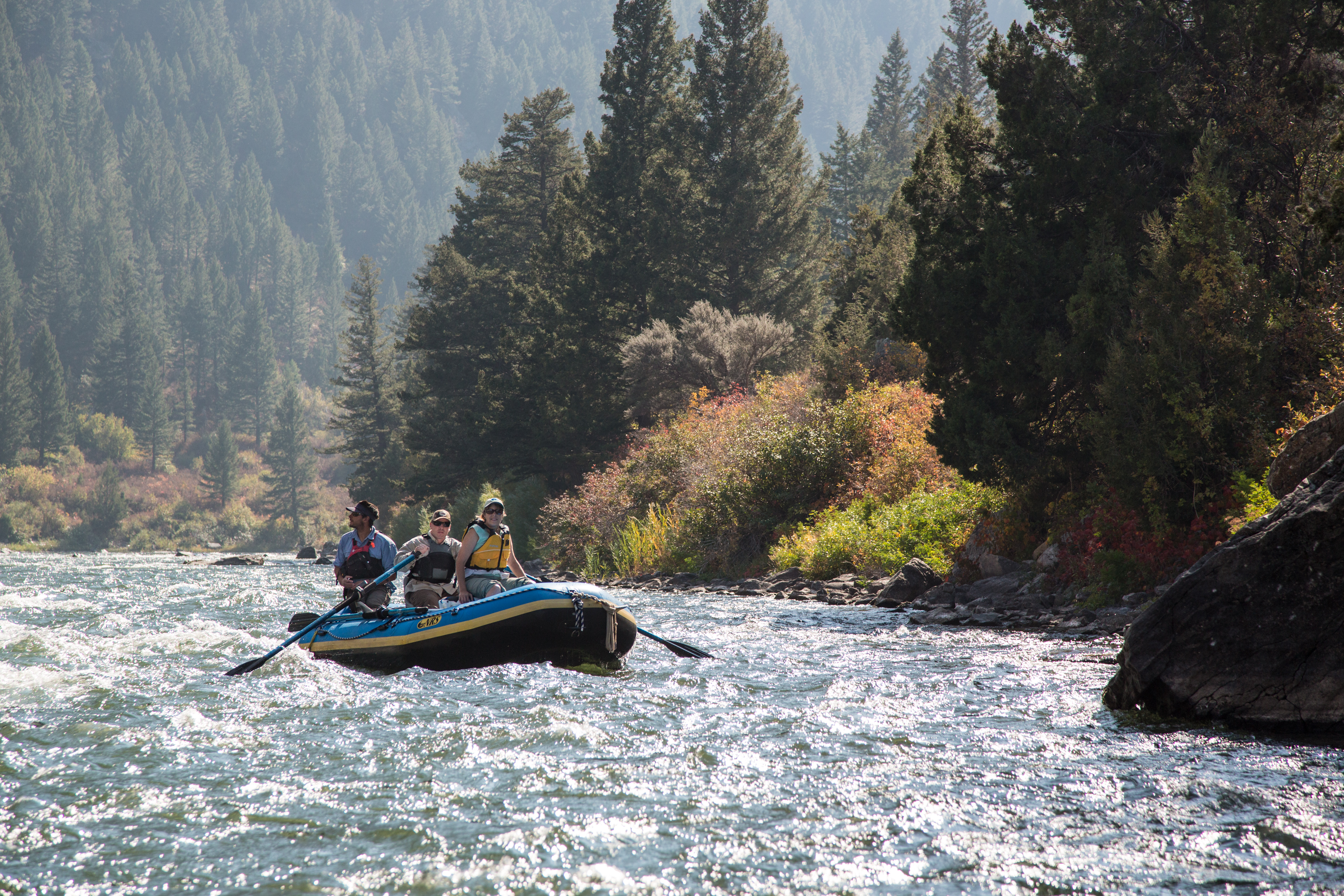

- Location within the United States
- Location: Washington County, Utah, USA
- Nearest city: Cedar City, UT
- Coordinates: 37.4257°N 113.0889°W
- Area: 40 acres (0.2 km^{2})
- Established: March 30, 2009
- Governing body: Bureau of Land Management

Beartrap Canyon Wilderness is a 40-acre (0.2 km^{2}) wilderness area in the US state of Utah. It was designated March 30, 2009, as part of the Omnibus Public Land Management Act of 2009. Located adjacent to the Kolob Canyons region of Zion National Park, it encompasses and protects part of Beartrap Canyon Creek, a tributary of the Wild & Scenic Virgin River. Beartrap Canyon Wilderness is bordered by the Zion Wilderness to the east.

Access to the canyon is from the LaVerkin Creek Trail in Zion National Park.

== See also ==
- List of U.S. Wilderness Areas
- Wilderness Act
