= White Canyon Wilderness =

Protected area in Pinal County, Arizona

- IUCN category Ib (wilderness area)
- Location within the United States
- Location: Pinal County, Arizona, US
- Nearest city: Superior, AZ
- Coordinates: 33.171428°N 111.097097°W
- Area: 5,790 acres (23 km^{2})
- Established: 1990
- Governing body: U.S. Department of Interior Bureau of Land Management

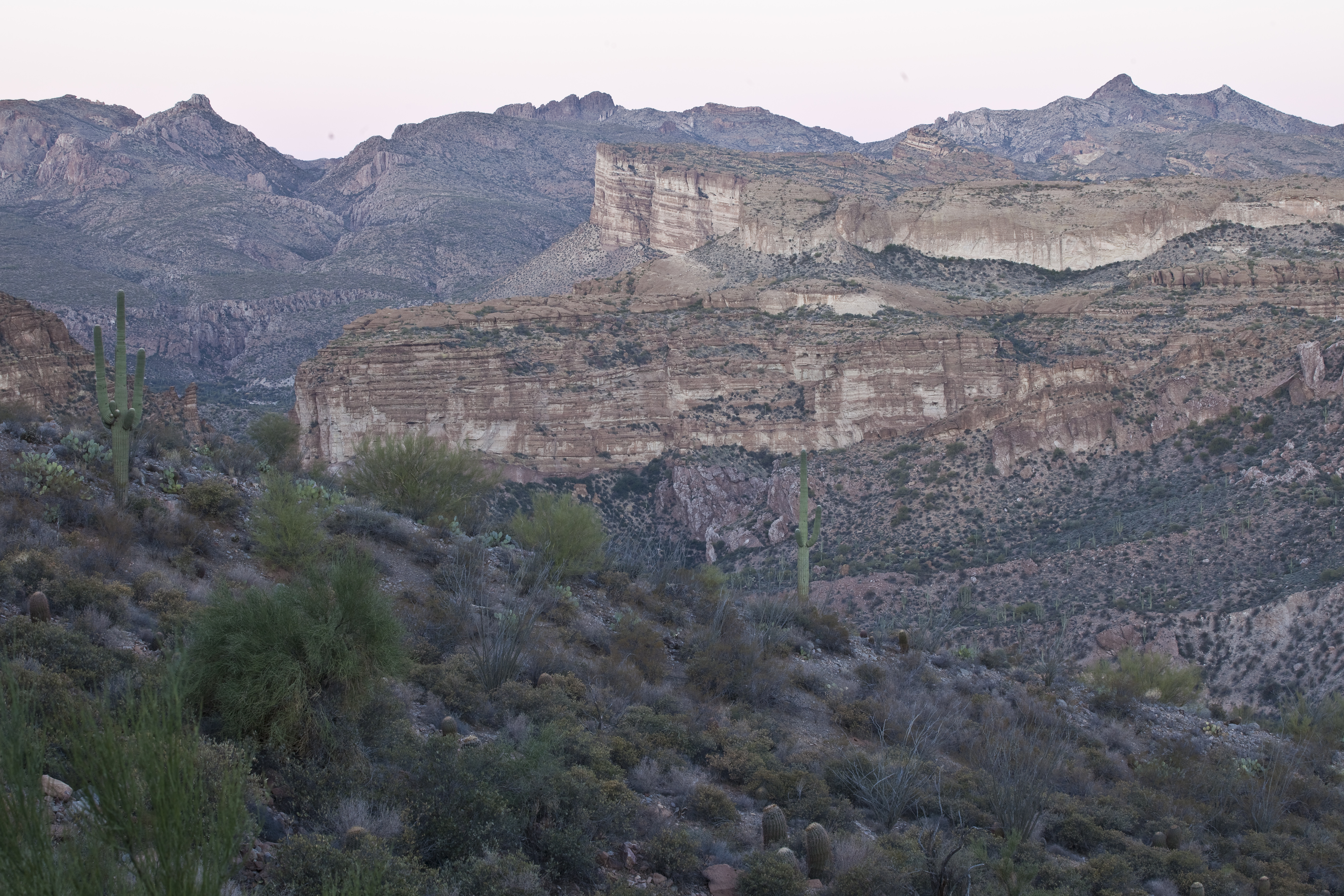
White Canyon Wilderness

White Canyon Wilderness is a protected wilderness area in the southeastern portion of the Mineral Mountains in the U.S. state of Arizona. Established in 1990 under the Arizona Desert Wilderness Act the area is managed by the Bureau of Land Management.

The namesake "White Canyon" runs through the middle of the wilderness area in a north-south direction. A very large escarpment known as the "Rincon" is a prominent landmark in the southern end of the wilderness. Vegetation in the area includes chaparral variety as well as saguaro cactus typical of the Sonoran Desert that support a variety of wildlife such as black bears and mountain lions.

== See also ==
- List of Arizona Wilderness Areas
- List of U.S. Wilderness Areas
