= Broad Canyon Wilderness =

Protected area in New Mexico, US

- IUCN category Ib (wilderness area)
- Location within New Mexico Location within the United States
- Location: Doña Ana County, New Mexico, USA
- Nearest city: Las Cruces, NM
- Coordinates: 32.4964919°N 107.1273824°W
- Area: 13,902 acres (56 km^{2})
- Established: 2019
- Governing body: U.S. Department of Interior Bureau of Land Management

Broad Canyon Wilderness is a 13,902-acre (5,625 ha) wilderness area in the Organ Mountains-Desert Peaks National Monument managed by the U.S. Bureau of Land Management in the US state of New Mexico. Established in 2019, this Wilderness located on the eastern end of the Sierra de las Uvas, contains small canyons created by water eroded lava flows opening into the surrounding Chihuahuan Desert.

== See also ==
- List of U.S. Wilderness Areas
