= Hassayampa River Canyon Wilderness =

Protected area in Yavapai County, Arizona

- IUCN category Ib (wilderness area)
- Location within the United States
- Location: Yavapai County, Arizona, US
- Nearest city: Congress, Arizona
- Coordinates: 34°06′37″N 112°35′46″W
- Area: 11,840 acres (48 km^{2})
- Established: 1990
- Governing body: U.S. Bureau of Land Management

The Hassayampa River Canyon Wilderness is an 11,840 acre (4,790 ha) wilderness area located in the U.S. state of Arizona. It lies north east of Wickenburg. The wilderness area was created in 1990 and is administered by the Bureau of Land Management. The Yavapai word for the Hassayampa River is 'Hasyambo, meaning "the water disappears".

== See also ==
- Wilderness Act
- List of U.S. Wilderness Areas
- List of Arizona Wilderness Areas
