= Taylor Creek Wilderness =

Wilderness area in Utah, United States

- IUCN category Ib (wilderness area)
- Location within the United States
- Location: Washington County, Utah, USA
- Nearest city: Cedar City, UT
- Coordinates: 37°27′16″N 113°08′37″W
- Area: 32 acres (0.1 km^{2})
- Established: March 30, 2009
- Governing body: Bureau of Land Management

Taylor Creek Wilderness is a 32-acre (0.1 km^{2}) wilderness area in the US state of Utah. It was designated March 30, 2009, as part of the Omnibus Public Land Management Act of 2009. Located adjacent to the Kolob Canyons region of Zion National Park, it encompasses and protects the upper headwaters of Taylor Creek, a tributary of the Wild & Scenic Virgin River. Taylor Creek Wilderness is bordered by the Zion Wilderness to the southwest.

== See also ==
- List of U.S. Wilderness Areas
- Wilderness Act
