= Fishhooks Wilderness =

Protected area in Graham County, Arizona

- IUCN category Ib (wilderness area)
- Interactive map of Fishhooks Wilderness
- Location: Graham County, Arizona, US
- Nearest city: Safford, Arizona
- Coordinates: 33°12′57″N 109°58′43″W
- Area: 10,500 acres (42 km^{2})
- Governing body: U.S. Bureau of Land Management

Fishhooks Wilderness is a 10,500-acre (42 km^{2}) wilderness area located in the U.S. state of Arizona. It is administered by the Bureau of Land Management and is located about 30 miles (48 km) northwest of Safford, Arizona. It borders the San Carlos Indian Reservation.

== Access ==
From Safford, travel west on Highway 70 for 15 miles (24 km), turn right on the Eden Road, and cross the Gila River Bridge. Turn left onto Hot Springs Road and travel 13 miles (21 km) along the north side of the Gila River on graded dirt county road. One mile past the wire gate across the road and just before the farm fields, turn northeast onto an unmarked dirt road and proceed straight through the junction. Ten miles from the county road is the Diamond Bar Ranch headquarters. From here, drive north for one mile (1.6 km) where the wilderness borders the road. Another road branches east at the headquarters forming the wilderness boundary after a half mile. Occasional signs mark the wilderness boundary along these two roads.

A recreation permit must be obtained from the San Carlos Apache Indian Reservation before crossing reservation lands.

== See also ==
- List of Arizona Wilderness Areas
- List of U.S. Wilderness Areas
