= Goose Creek Wilderness =

Protected area in Utah, United States

- IUCN category Ib (wilderness area)
- Location within Utah Location within the United States
- Location: Washington County, Utah, USA
- Nearest city: Cedar City, UT
- Coordinates: 37.3720°N 112.9957°W
- Area: 98 acres (0.4 km^{2})
- Established: March 30, 2009
- Governing body: Bureau of Land Management

Goose Creek Wilderness is a 98-acre (0.4 km^{2}) wilderness area in the US state of Utah. It was designated March 30, 2009, as part of the Omnibus Public Land Management Act of 2009. Located adjacent to the northern boundary of Zion National Park, it protects a portion of the upper reaches of Goose Creek, a tributary of the Wild and Scenic Virgin River. Goose Creek Wilderness is bordered by the Zion Wilderness to the south.

== See also ==
- List of U.S. Wilderness Areas
- Wilderness Act
