= Bosque del Apache Wilderness =

Wilderness area in New Mexico, United States

- IUCN category Ib (wilderness area)
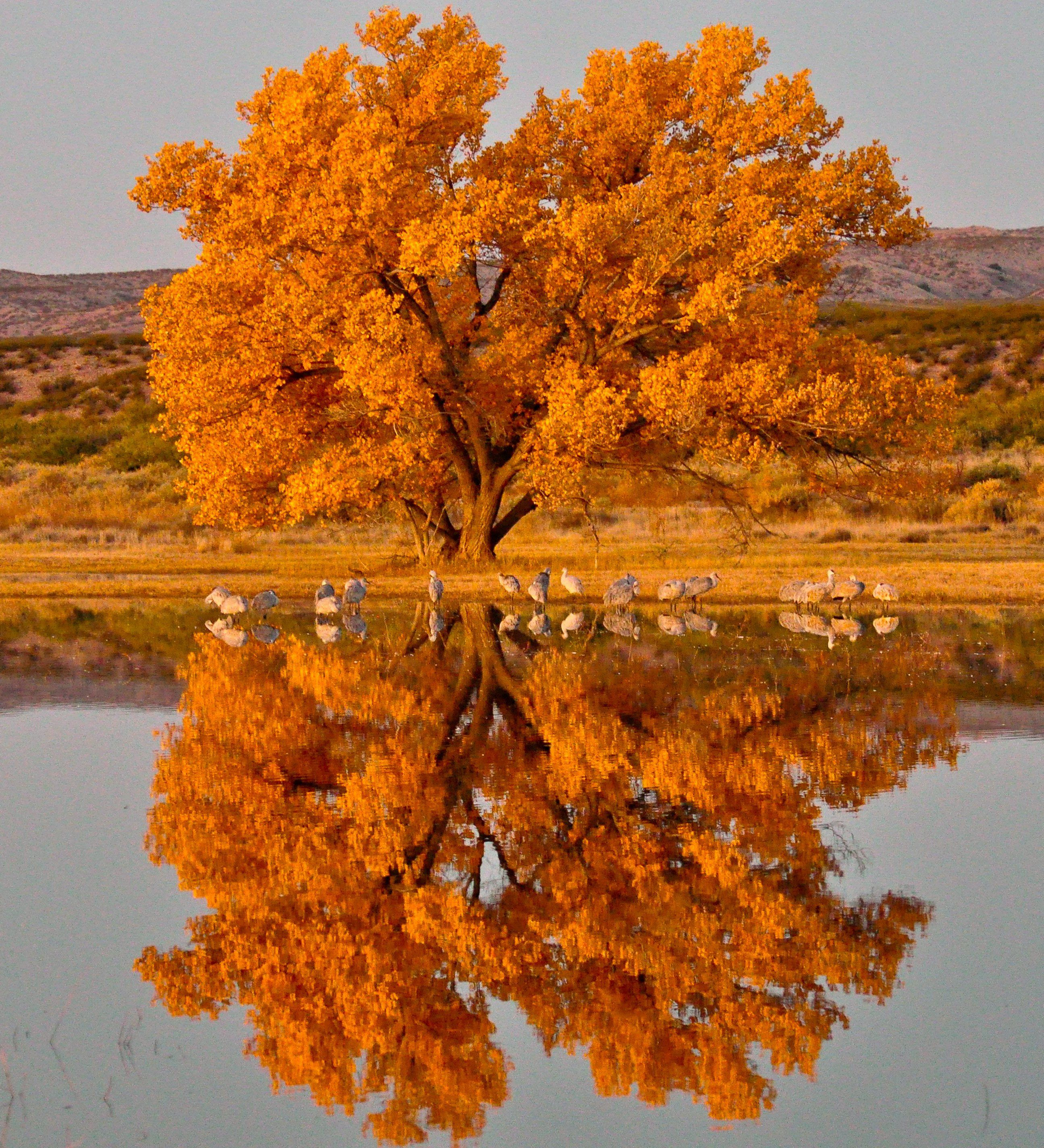
- Cottonwood tree along the Rio Grande

- Location within the United States
- Location: Socorro County, New Mexico, United States
- Nearest city: Socorro
- Coordinates: 33°48′57.8″N 106°53′13.5″W
- Area: 30,427 acres (123.13 km^{2})
- Established: 1975
- Governing body: United States Fish and Wildlife Service

Bosque del Apache Wilderness is a designated Wilderness Area on the Bosque del Apache National Wildlife Refuge in Socorro County, New Mexico. Managed by the U.S. Fish and Wildlife Service, the Wilderness, established in 1975, contains 30,427 acres distributed between three units.

== The refuge ==
Bosque del Apache National Wildlife Refuge was established in 1939 to protect a crucial stopover for migrating waterfowl, such as sandhill cranes and geese. Located in Socorro County, the refuge lies between the Chupadera Mountains to the west and the San Pascual Mountains to the east and contains 57,331 acres of land along both banks of the Rio Grande.

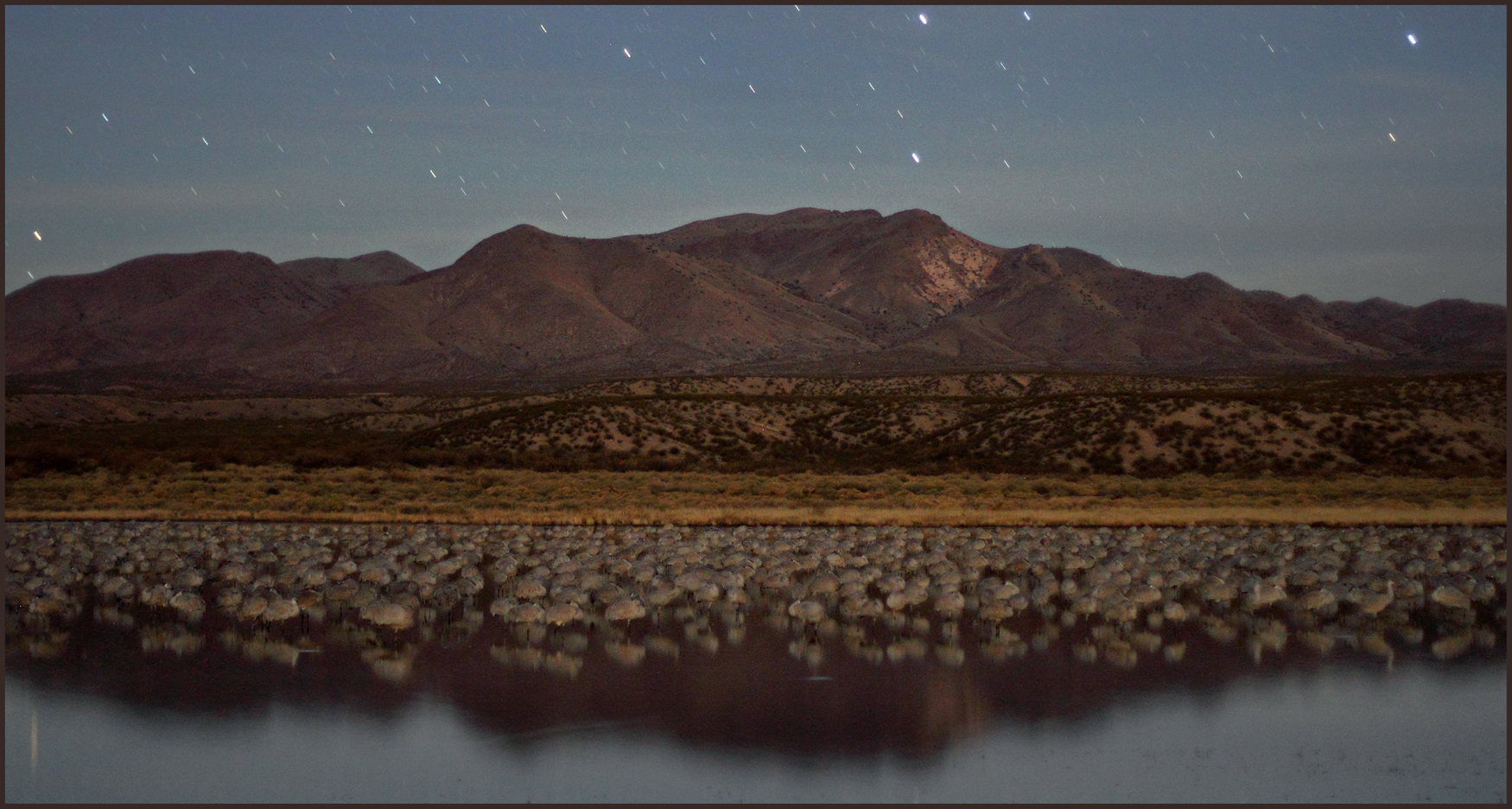
Bosque del Apache at night

During the migratory season the refuge can be visited by 12,000 sandhill cranes, 70,000 snow geese, over 40,000 ducks from 14 different species, and over 300 other varieties of bird. Though a prime site for birding, the Refuge also contains a number of muledeer, coyotes, and wild javelina, among other species.

== The wilderness ==
Established in 1975, the Bosque del Apapche Wilderness is composed of three smaller units, the Little San Pascual Wilderness, which covers 19,859 acres, the 5,429-acre Chupadera Wilderness, and the 5,139-acre Indian Well Unit. The Indian Wells and Chupadera units are located on opposite sides of U.S. I-25, approximately 16 miles south of Socorro, while the Little San Pacual unit is east of Indian Wells on the eastern bank of the Rio Grande.

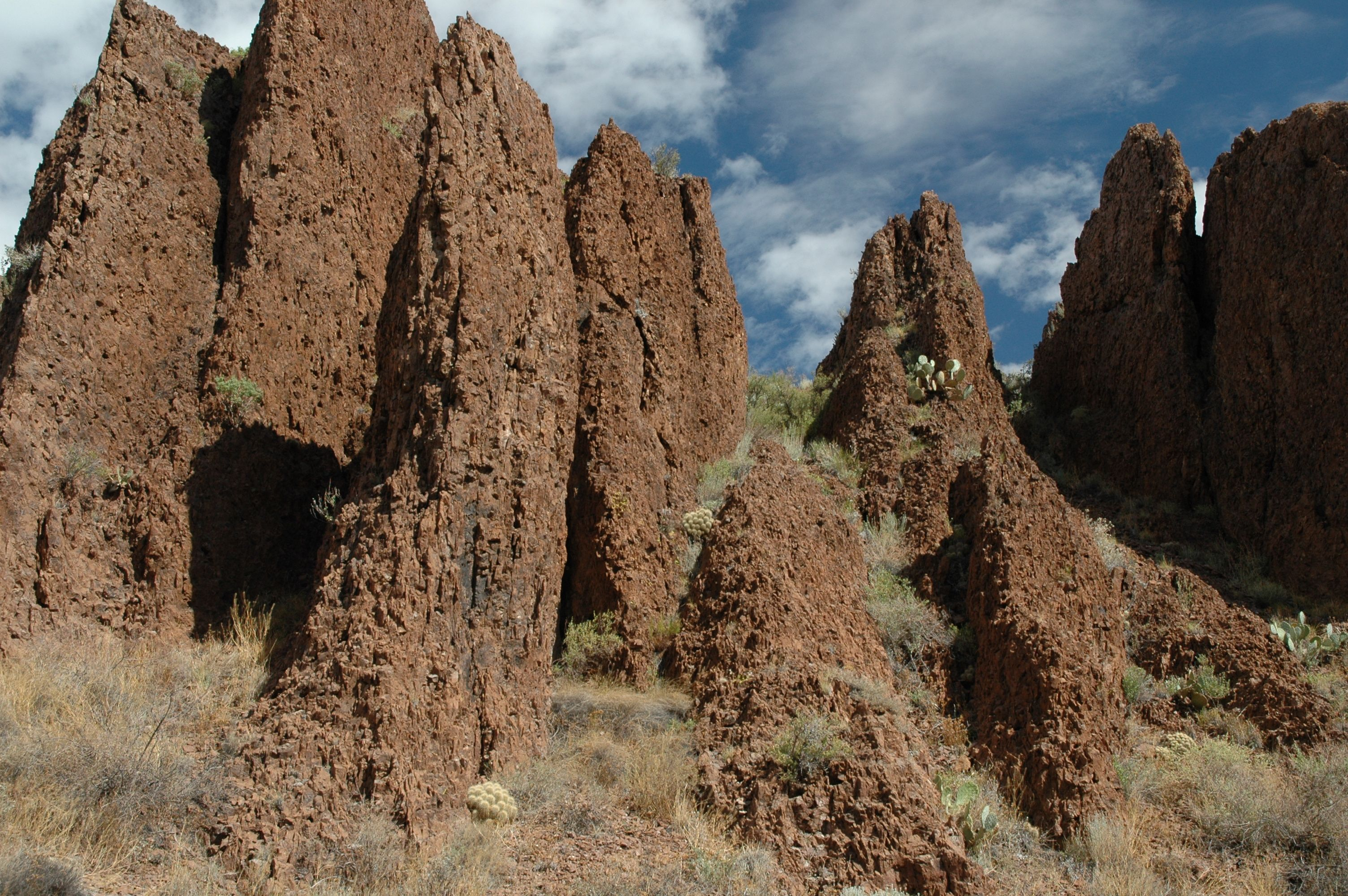
Chupadera National Recreation Trail

A designated Wilderness, as described by the Wilderness Act of 1964, motorized vehicles, bicycles and horses are prohibited in the three units. A day-use area, there is no overnight camping, but hikers can access the area year-round between one hour before sunrise to one hour after sunset. While off-trail hiking is allowed, there are two developed trails, the Chupadera Wilderness National Recreation Trail in the Chupadera Wilderness, and the Canyon National Recreation Trail in the Indian Well Wilderness. The 9.2 mile Chupadera Trail is a moderately strenuous trail that begins on the floor of the Chihuahuan Desert and climbs over 1800 feet to the top of Chupadera Mountain. Part of this trail includes a one mile loop trail that leads to a scenic overlook in the foothills above the refuge. The Canyon Trail, a 2.2 mile trail in the Indian Well Wilderness leads across the desert floor to Solitude Canyon and offers a number of scenic vistas.

== See also ==
- Bosque del Apache National Wildlife Refuge
