= Lower White River Wilderness =

Protected wilderness in the US State of Oregon

- IUCN category Ib (wilderness area)
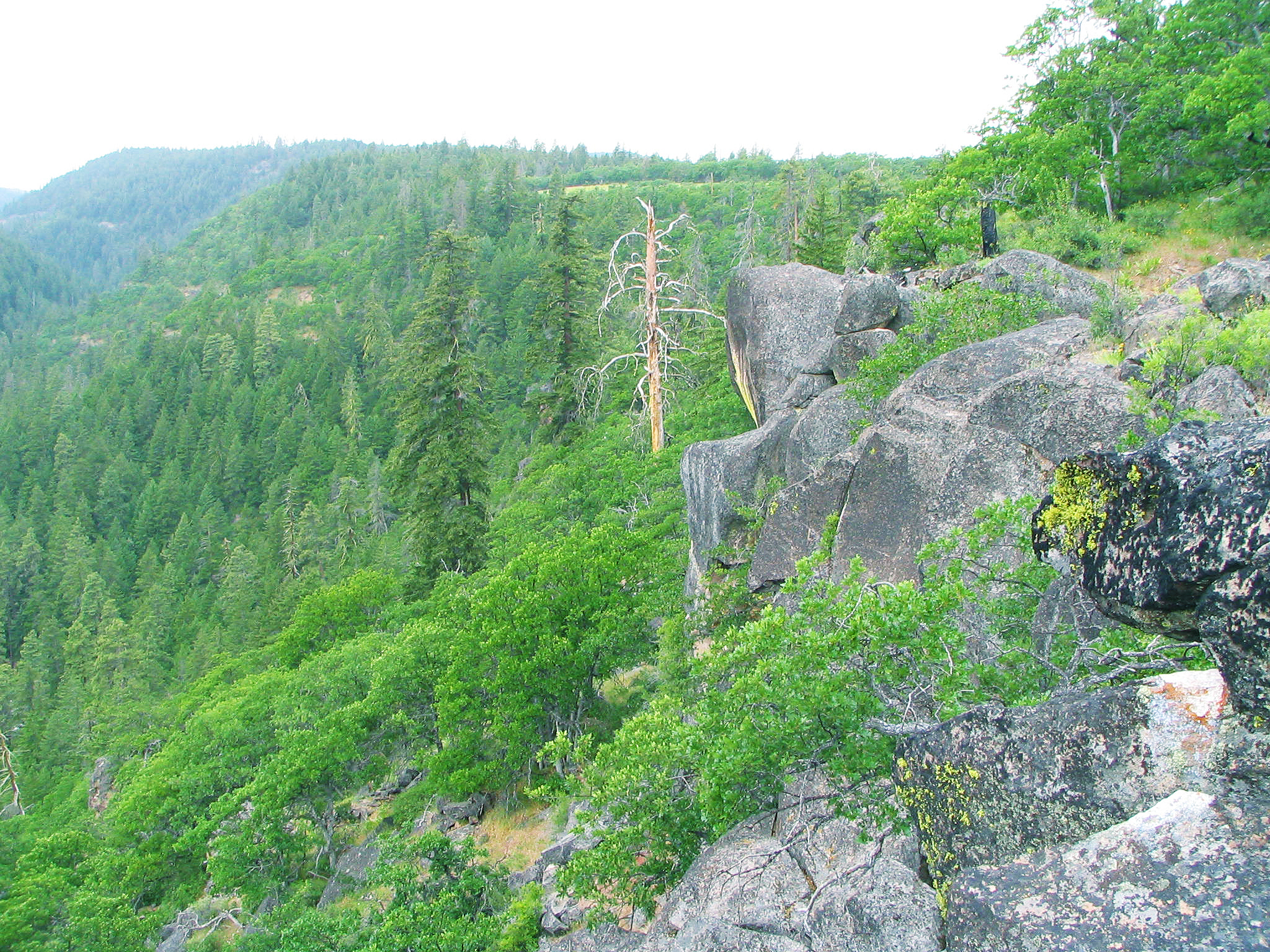
- A rocky slope in the wilderness

- Location within the United States
- Location: Wasco County, Oregon
- Nearest city: Hood River
- Coordinates: 45°08′36″N 121°27′04″W
- Area: 2,806 acres (1,136 ha)
- Established: 2009
- Governing body: U.S. Forest Service and Bureau of Land Management

Lower White River Wilderness is a protected wilderness in the US State of Oregon on the southern part of Mount Hood. In 2009, Congress designated the area a National Wilderness preserve.

The White River rises from White River Glacier in White River Canyon. While some additions to the Mount Hood Wilderness protect the upper parts of the river, the Lower River Stretch is protected by the Lower White River Wilderness. Managed by the U.S. Bureau of Land Management and the U.S. Forest Service, Keeps Mill Campground maintains primitive trails, camping areas, and staging areas.

== Available activities ==
- Camping
- Fishing
- Hiking/Backpacking
- Wildlife Viewing
