= Elkhorn Ridge Wilderness =

Protected wilderness area in California, United States

- IUCN category Ib (wilderness area)
- Location within the United States
- Location: Mendocino County, California, United States
- Nearest city: Leggett, California
- Coordinates: 39°47′24″N 123°38′54″W
- Area: 11,001 acres (44.52 km^{2})
- Established: January 13, 2011
- Governing body: Bureau of Land Management

The Elkhorn Ridge Wilderness is a 11,001-acre (4,452 ha) wilderness area located in Mendocino County, California. The redwood and mixed evergreen forests on coastal range ridges that make up this area is managed by the U.S. Bureau of Land Management. Wildlife in the area includes the northern spotted owl, bald eagles, and peregrine falcons.
