= Granite Mountain Wilderness (California) =

Protected wilderness area in California, United States

- IUCN category Ib (wilderness area)
- Location within California Location within the United States
- Location: Mono County, California USA
- Nearest city: Mammoth Lakes, CA
- Coordinates: 37°59′22″N 118°47′16″W
- Area: 31,059 acres (125.69 km^{2})
- Established: March 30, 2009
- Governing body: Bureau of Land Management

The Granite Mountain Wilderness is a 31,059-acre (125.69 km^{2}) wilderness area in the Great Basin region of California. Immediately due east of Mono Lake, it was created in 2009 when President Barack Obama signed the Omnibus Public Land Management Act.

The area was previously a Wilderness Study Area and an attempt was made to classify it as wilderness in 1991. The area was deemed unsuitable because of a high potential for geothermal resources; later studies showed a low potential, and the Bureau of Land Management gave testimony in 2008 in support of Representative Buck McKeon's legislation to have the area designated as wilderness.
