= Salt Creek Wilderness =

Protected area in New Mexico, US

- IUCN category Ib (wilderness area)
- Location within New Mexico Location within the United States
- Location: Chaves County, New Mexico, United States
- Nearest city: Roswell
- Coordinates: 33°35′16.7″N 104°21′46.7″W
- Area: 9,621 acres (38.93 km^{2})
- Established: 1970
- Governing body: United States Fish and Wildlife Service

Salt Creek Wilderness is a designated Wilderness Area located on the Pecos River approximately 12 miles north-east of Roswell, New Mexico. Established in 1970 within the Bitter Lake National Wildlife Refuge, the 9,621 acre Wilderness is administered by the U. S Fish and Wildlife Service. Combining the scrub lands of the Chihuahuan Desert with the riparian environment of the Pecos River and the Artesian basin of eastern New Mexico, Salt Creek represents a rare convergence of desert and wetlands.

== The Refuge ==
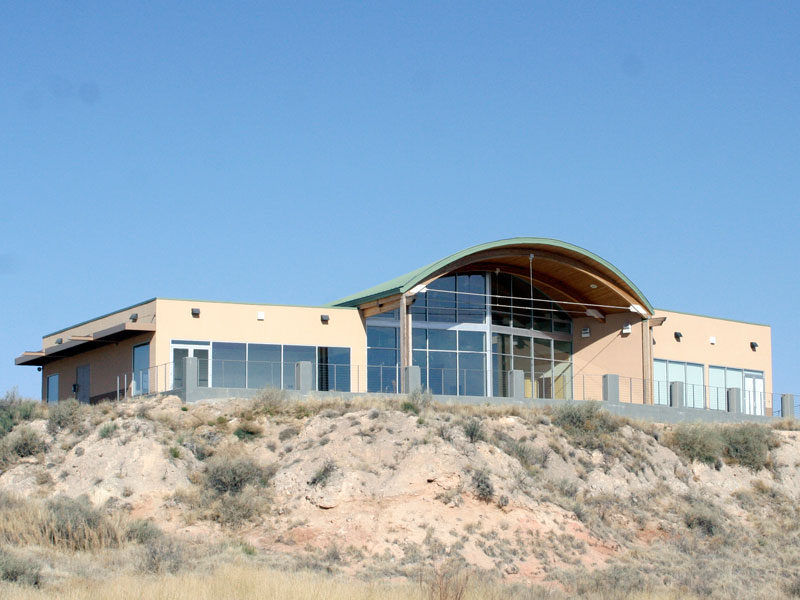
Bitter Lake N.W.R. Visitor Center

Established in 1937, the Bitter Lake National Wildlife Refuge is an important waypoint for thousands of migratory waterfowl, as well as the year-round home of a number of native species. Between October and February, the seasonal wetlands of the 24,609-acre unit are a temporary home to tens of thousands of ducks, geese, and cranes, as well as large populations of white pelicans and snowy egrets.

== The Wilderness ==
Unlike the riparian areas found in the other units of Bitter Lake NWR, which draw thousands of migratory waterfowl annually, the Salt Creek area sees few migratory birds, since the area has no wetlands. The Area was originally proposed as a Wilderness area to protect the red rock bluffs at the north end of the unit, home to populations of native species such as roadrunners and quail, as well as cottontails, black-tailed jackrabbits, deer, coyotes, and bobcats. The unit includes a section of the Pecos River, as well as a number of sinkhole lakes, many of which are habitat for the Pecos pupfish.

== Location and Access ==
A separate unit of the Bitter Lake NWR, the Salt Creek Wilderness is located along and north of U. S. Highway 70, locally known as the Clovis Highway. The main access point to the southern end of the Wilderness is located on U S. 70, approximately 10 miles from the intersection of U S. 70 with U. S. 285, 2 miles north of Roswell, N.M. The western end of the Wilderness can be accessed via Chaves County Road 15, also known as One Horse Road, from its intersection with U. S. 285, 7.5 miles north of the intersection of 285 and U. S. 70. This is a day-use only area, with no camping or campfires allowed.
