= Woodbury =

Woodbury may refer to:

== Geography ==
=== Antarctica ===
- Woodbury Glacier, a glacier on Graham Land, British Antarctic Territory

=== Australia ===
- Woodbury, Tasmania, a locality in Australia
- Woodbury, Queensland, a locality in Australia

=== England ===
- Woodbury, Bournemouth, an area in Dorset
- Woodbury, East Devon, a village and civil parish in East Devon
  - Woodbury Castle, a hillfort near the village of Woodbury in Devon
- Woodbury, Stoke Fleming, South Hams, Devon
- Little Woodbury, an archaeological site near Salisbury in Wiltshire
- Woodbury Hill, Worcestershire, the site of the declaration of Worcestershire's Clubmen in the first English Civil War

=== New Zealand ===
- Woodbury, New Zealand, a village near Geraldine in Canterbury

=== United States ===
- Woodbury, Connecticut
- Woodbury, Georgia
- Woodbury, Indiana
- Woodbury, Irvine, California
- Woodbury, Kentucky
- Woodbury, Illinois
- Woodbury, Michigan
- Woodbury, Minnesota, the most populous place with the name
- Woodbury, New Jersey
  - Woodbury station
- Woodbury, New York (disambiguation)
  - Woodbury, Nassau County, New York, on Long Island
  - Woodbury, Orange County, New York, in the Hudson Valley
- Woodbury, Pennsylvania
- Woodbury, Tennessee
- Woodbury, Vermont
- Woodbury County, Iowa
- Woodbury (Leetown, West Virginia), historic house listed on the National Register of Historic Places
- Woodbury Creek, a stream in Minnesota
- Fort Woodbury, a fortification on the Arlington Line during the American Civil War

=== Fictional ===
- Woodbury, Georgia - the settlement presided over by The Governor in The Walking Dead franchise

== People ==
- Woodbury (name)

== Other uses ==
- USS Woodbury, one of several ships of the United States Navy

== See also ==
- Woodbury Common (disambiguation)
- Woodbury High School (disambiguation)
- Woodbury House (disambiguation)
- Woodbury Township (disambiguation)
- Woodbury College, Montpelier, Vermont, United States
- Woodbury Common Premium Outlets in Central Valley, New York, United States (part of the town of Woodbury, Orange County)
- Woodbury matrix identity, a mathematical formula
- Woodbury Soap Company
- Woodbury University, Burbank, California, United States
