= List of federal lands in Utah =

The following are protected federal lands in the state of Utah:

== National Parks ==
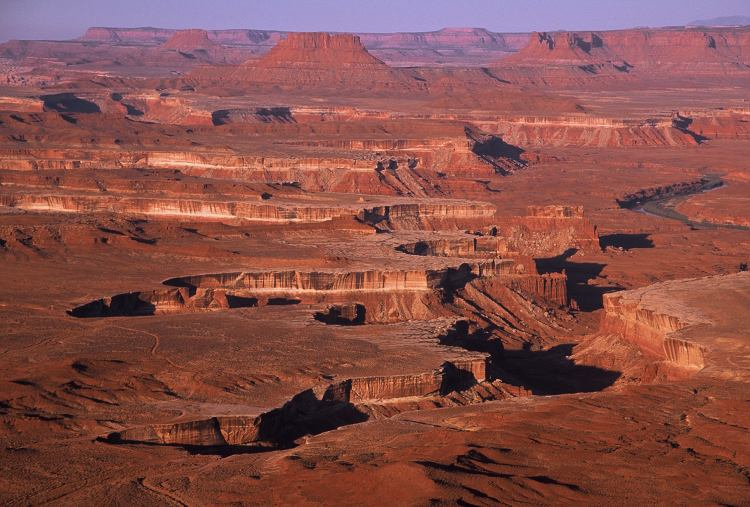
The classic view of Canyonlands National Park from the Green River Overlook, in the Island in the Sky district

There are five National Parks within the state of Utah:

- Zion National Park near Springdale
- Bryce Canyon National Park near Tropic
- Capitol Reef National Park and near Torrey
- Arches National Park near Moab
- Canyonlands National Park near Moab

== National Monuments ==
The eight National Monuments in the state of Utah are:

- Bears Ears National Monument near San Juan County
- Cedar Breaks National Monument near Cedar City
- Dinosaur National Monument near Vernal
- Grand Staircase–Escalante National Monument near Kanab
- Hovenweep National Monument near Bluff
- Natural Bridges National Monument near Mexican Hat
- Rainbow Bridge National Monument near Page, Arizona
- Timpanogos Cave National Monument near Highland

== National Recreation Areas ==
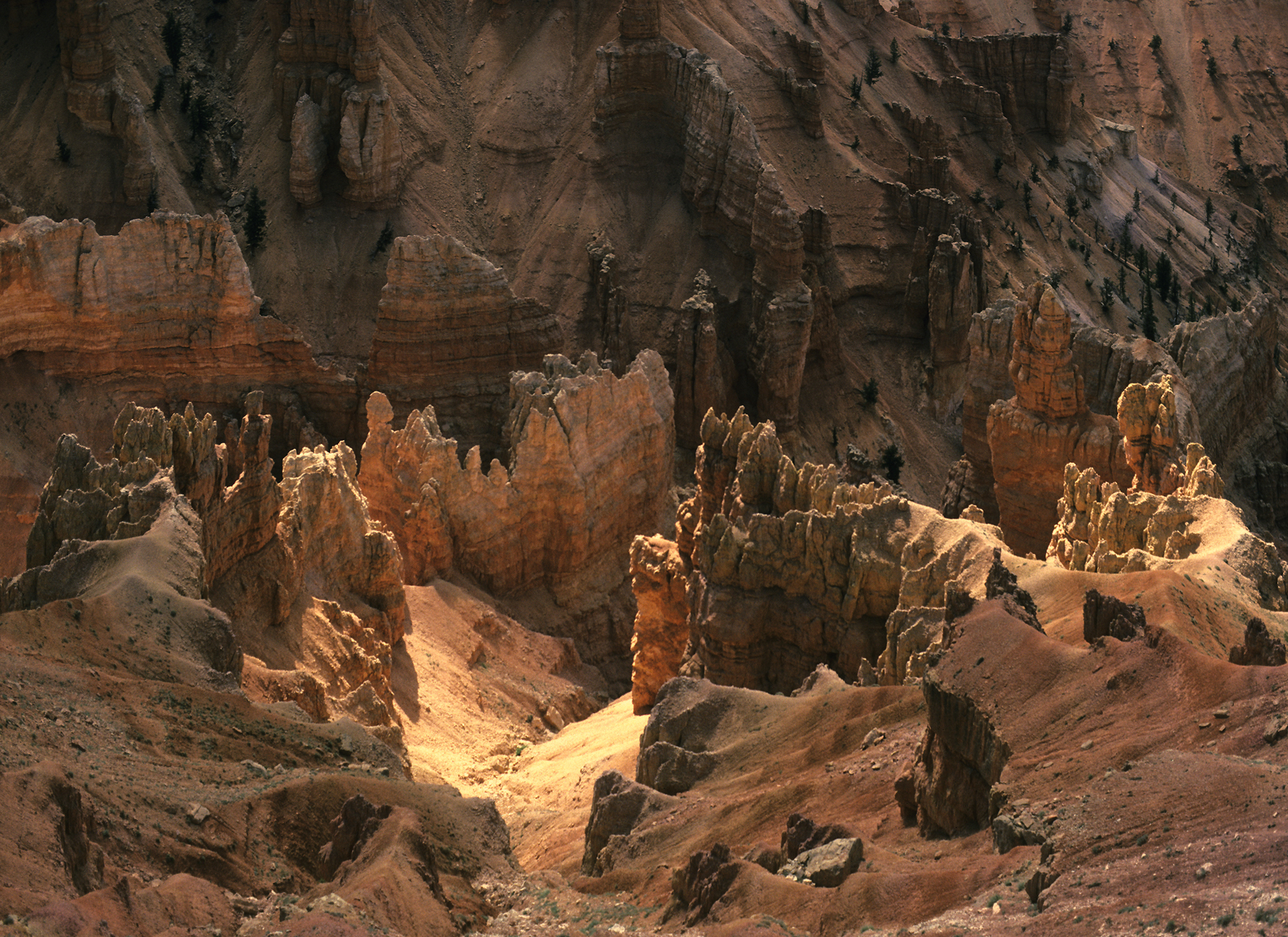
Hoodoos in Cedar Breaks National Monument

The two National Recreation Areas within the state of Utah are:

- Glen Canyon National Recreation Area, located in Kane County, San Juan County, Garfield County
- Flaming Gorge National Recreation Area, located in Daggett County

== National Historical Parks ==
The one National Historical Park within the state of Utah is:

- Golden Spike National Historical Park near Corinne

== National Historic Trails ==
There are 583 miles of National Historic Trails in Utah, which include the following trails:

- California National Historic Trail through northern Utah
- Old Spanish National Historic Trail through central and southern Utah
- Pony Express National Historic Trail through northern Utah

== National Forests ==
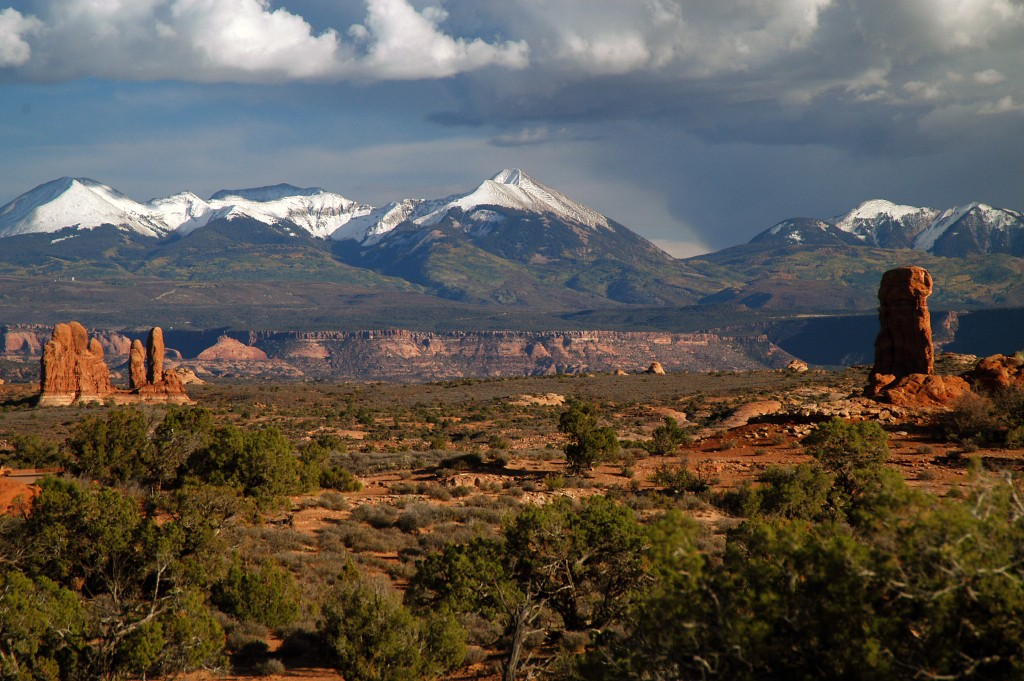
Manti-La Sal National Forest mountain range as seen from Arches National Park

The 7 National Forests within the state of Utah are:

- Ashley National Forest
- Dixie National Forest
- Fishlake National Forest
- Manti La Sal National Forest
- Sawtooth National Forest
- Uinta-Wasatch Cache National Forest
- Caribou–Targhee National Forest

== Wilderness Areas ==
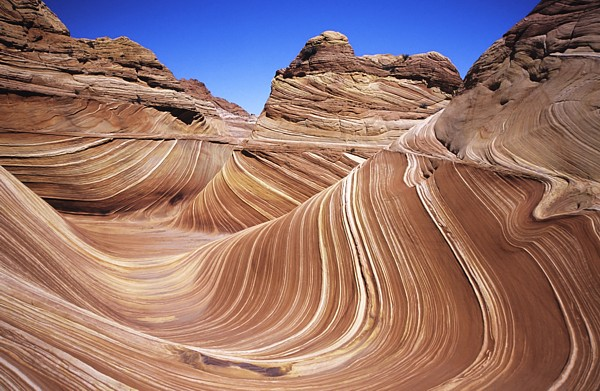
The Wave formation in Paria Canyon-Vermilion Cliffs Wilderness

The 31 Wilderness Areas within the state of Utah are:

- Ashdown Gorge Wilderness
- Beartrap Canyon Wilderness
- Beaver Dam Mountains Wilderness
- Black Ridge Canyons Wilderness
- Box-Death Hollow Wilderness
- Canaan Mountain Wilderness
- Cedar Mountain Wilderness
- Cottonwood Forest Wilderness
- Cougar Canyon Wilderness
- Dark Canyon Wilderness
- Deep Creek Wilderness
- Deseret Peak Wilderness
- Doc's Pass Wilderness
- Goose Creek Wilderness
- High Uintas Wilderness
- LaVerkin Creek Wilderness
- Lone Peak Wilderness
- Mount Naomi Wilderness
- Mount Nebo Wilderness
- Mount Olympus Wilderness
- Mount Timpanogos Wilderness
- Paria Canyon-Vermilion Cliffs Wilderness
- Pine Valley Mountain Wilderness
- Red Butte Wilderness
- Red Mountain Wilderness
- Slaughter Creek Wilderness
- Taylor Creek Wilderness
- Twin Peaks Wilderness
- Wellsville Mountains Wilderness
- Zion Wilderness

== National Conservation Areas ==
The two National Conservation Areas within the state of Utah are:

- Red Cliffs National Conservation Area
- Beaver Dam Wash National Conservation Area

== National Wildlife Refuges ==
The three National Wildlife Refuges within the state of Utah are:

- Bear River Migratory Bird Wildlife Refuge
- Fish Springs National Wildlife Refuge
- Ouray National Wildlife Refuge

== National Recreation Trails ==
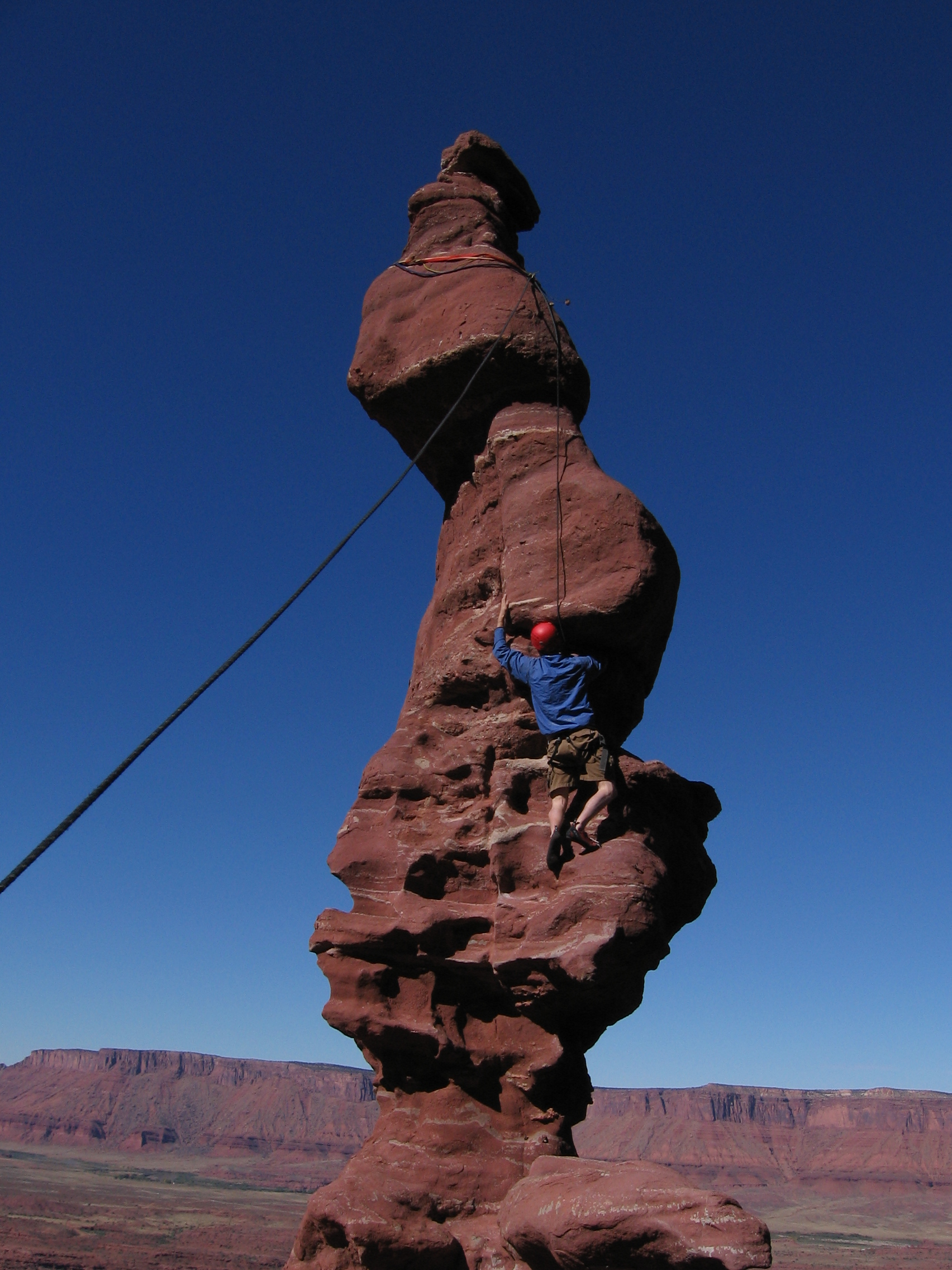
Climber ascends the Corkscrew, Ancient Art Tower, Fisher Tower National Recreation Trail

The 18 federally designated National Recreation Trails in the state of Utah are:

- Bald Mountain National Recreation Trail
- Bicentennial National Recreation Trail
- Cascade Falls National Recreation Trail v
- Cascade Springs National Recreation Trail
- Fish Creek National Recreation Trail
- Fish Creek National Recreation Trail (there are two called Fish Creek)
- Fisher Towers National Recreation Trail
- Gooseberry Mesa National Recreation Trail
- Historic Union Pacific Rail National Recreation Trail
- Lakeshore National Recreation Trail
- Left Fork Huntington Creek National Recreation Trail
- Little Hole National Recreation Trail
- Moab Slickrock Bike National Recreation Trail
- Mount Timpanogos National Recreation Trail
- Naomi Peak National Recreation Trail
- Skyline National Recreation Trail
- Wetland Wonders Walk National Recreation Trail
- Whipple National Recreation Trail

== National Scenic Byways ==
The 8 federally designated National Scenic Byways in the state of Utah are:

- Brian Head-Panguitch Lake National Scenic Byway
- Dinosaur Diamond Prehistoric Highway National Scenic Byway
- Energy Loop: Huntington & Eccles Canyons National Scenic Byway
- Flaming Gorge-Uintas National Scenic Byway
- Highway 12 All American Road National Scenic Byway
- Logan Canyon National Scenic Byway
- Nebo Loop National Scenic Byway
- Trail of the Ancients National Scenic Byway

== Gallery ==
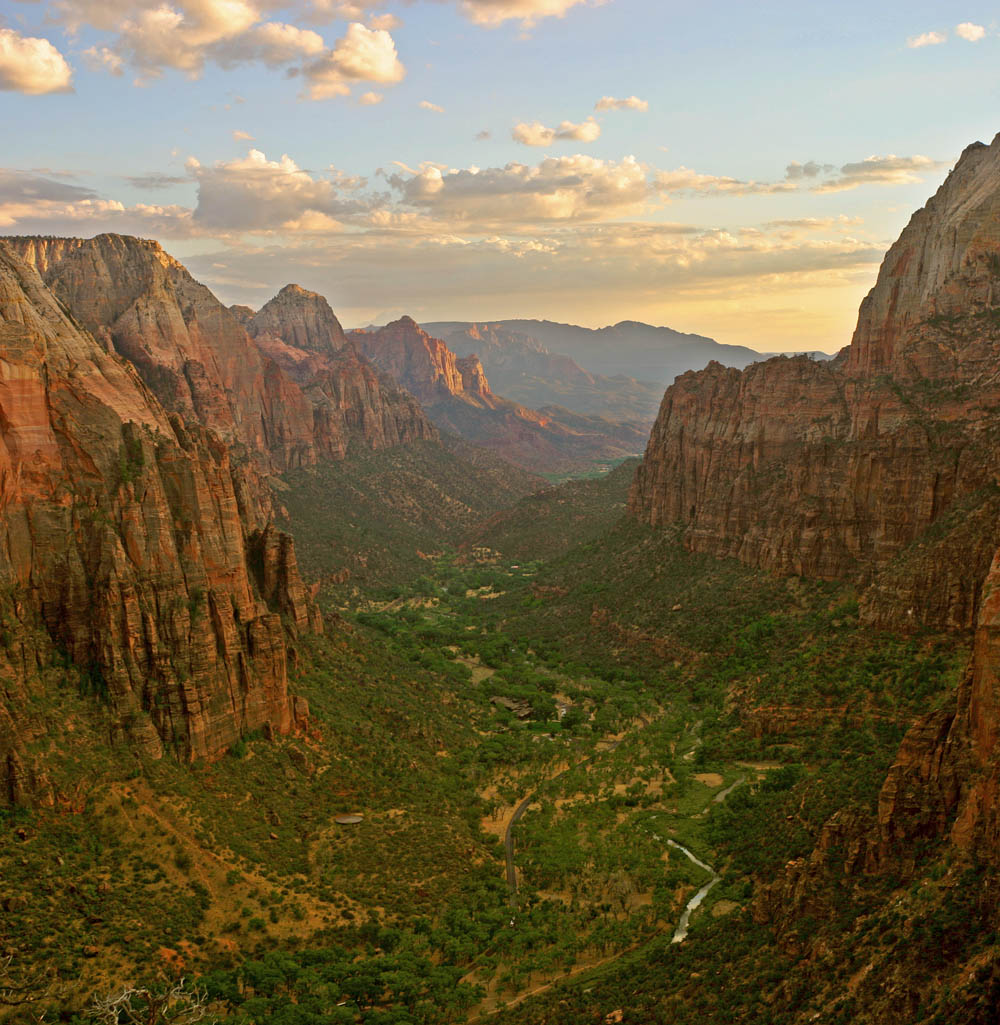
Zion Canyon at sunset in Zion National Park as seen from Angels Landing looking south.

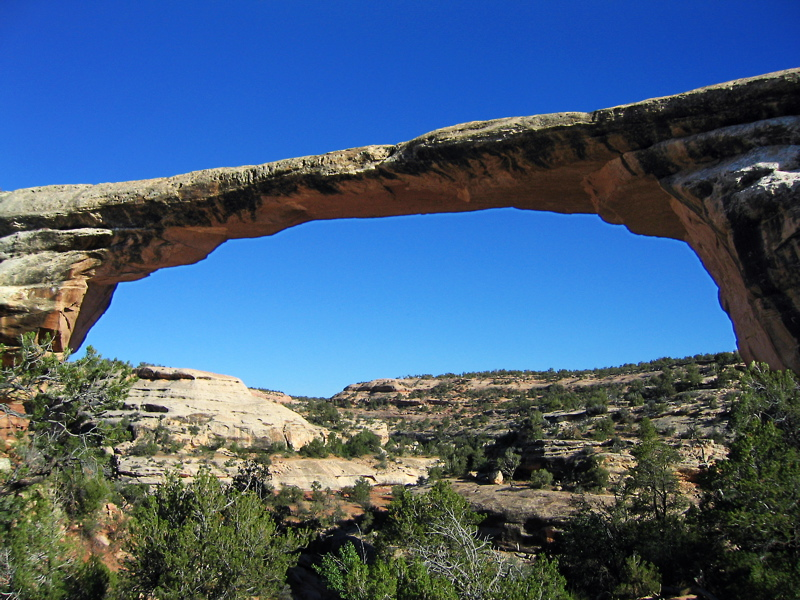
Natural Bridge Owachomo at Natural Bridges National Monument

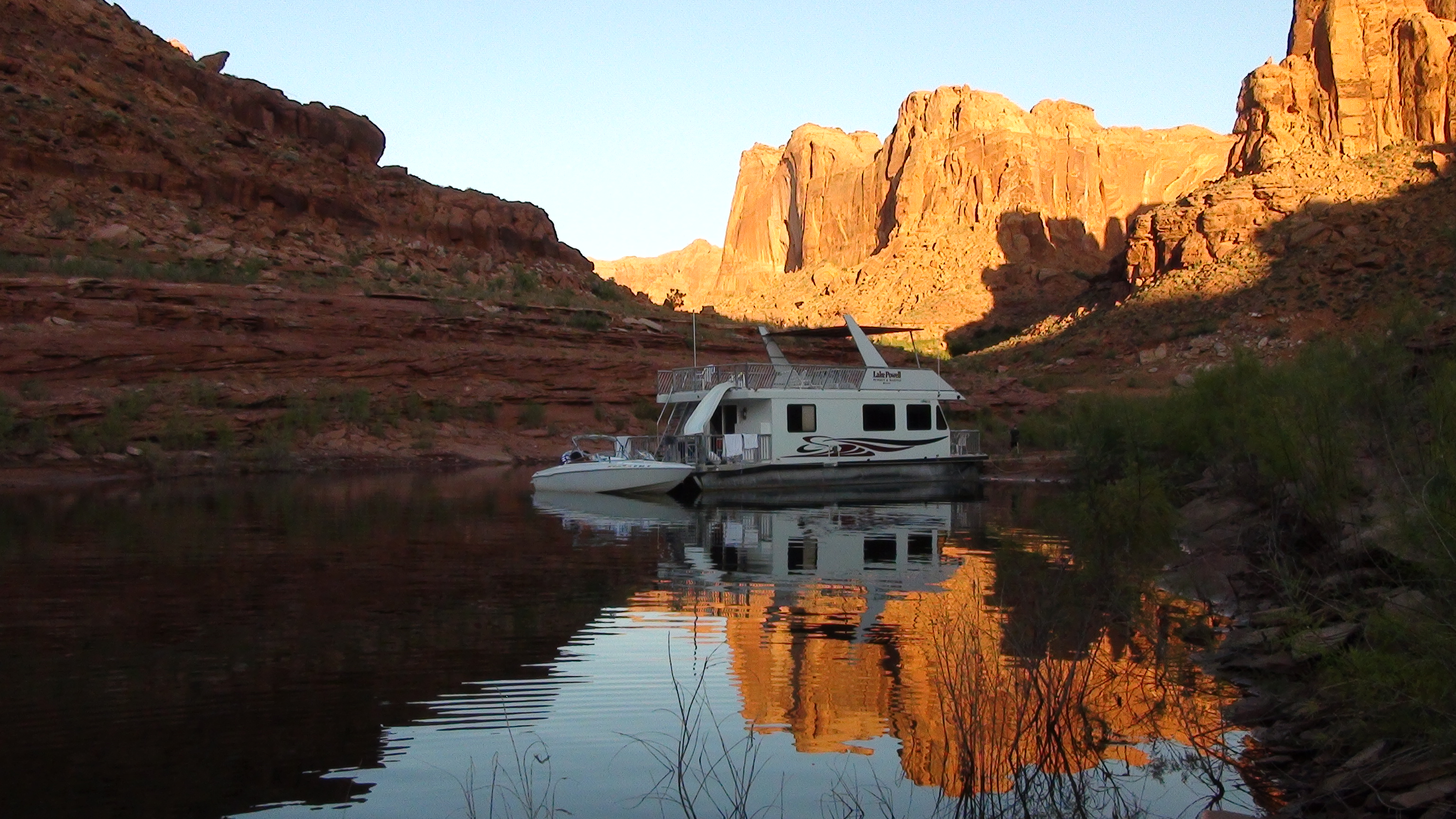
Houseboat on Lake Powell, Utah at Glen Canyon National Recreation Area

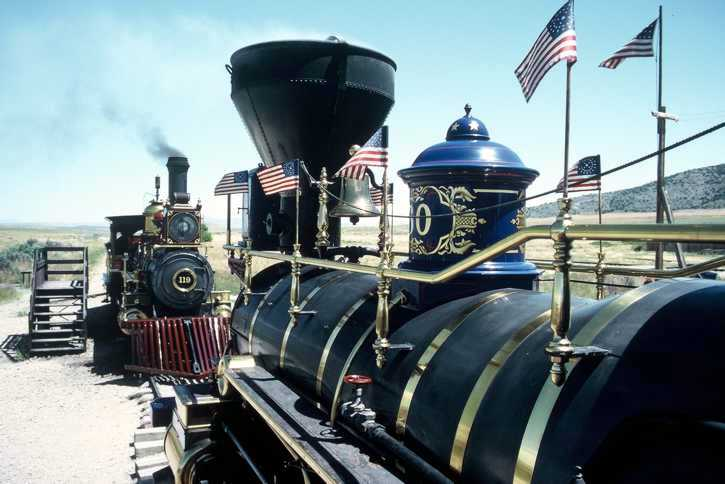
Steam engines at Golden Spike National Historic Site

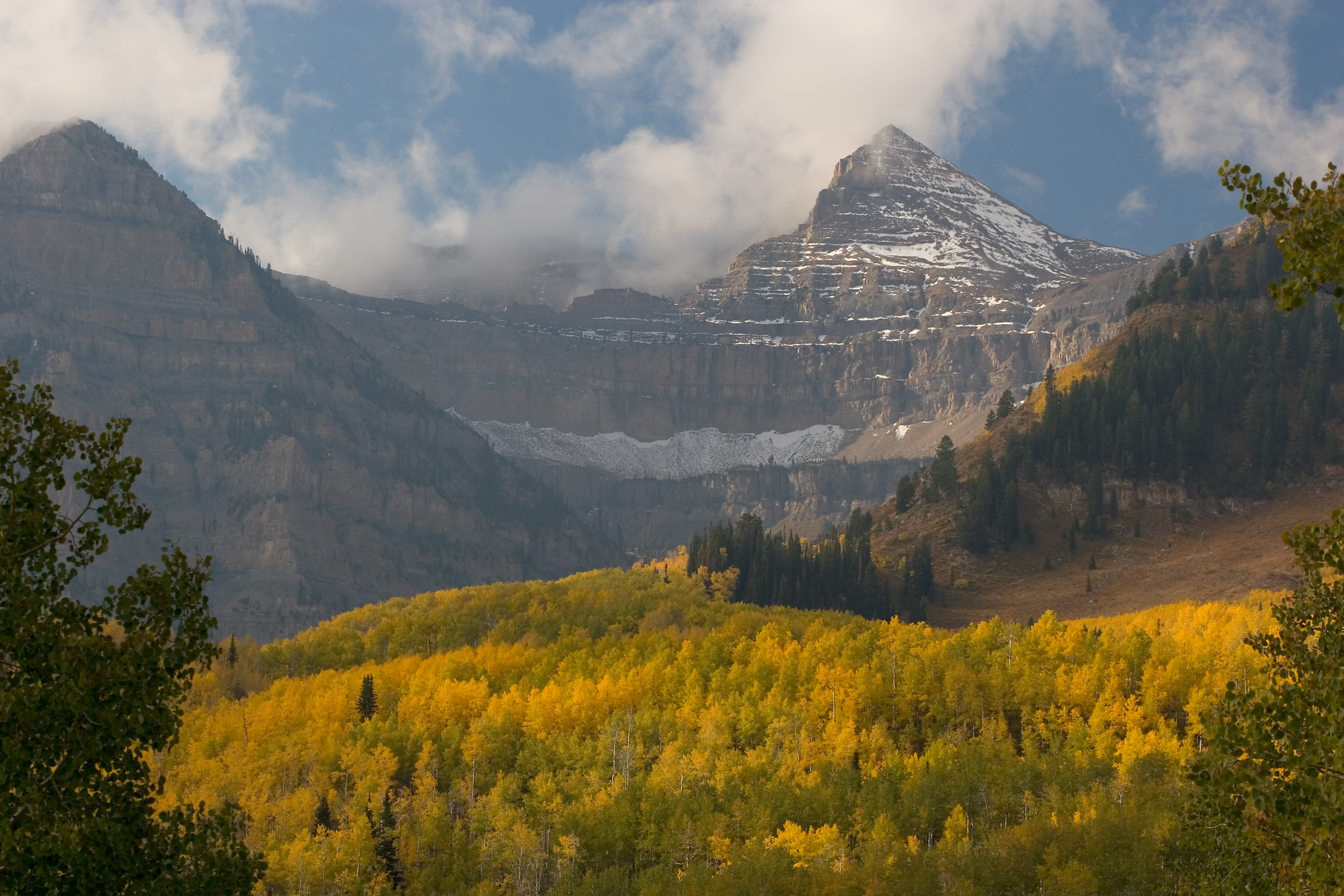
Uinta National Forest

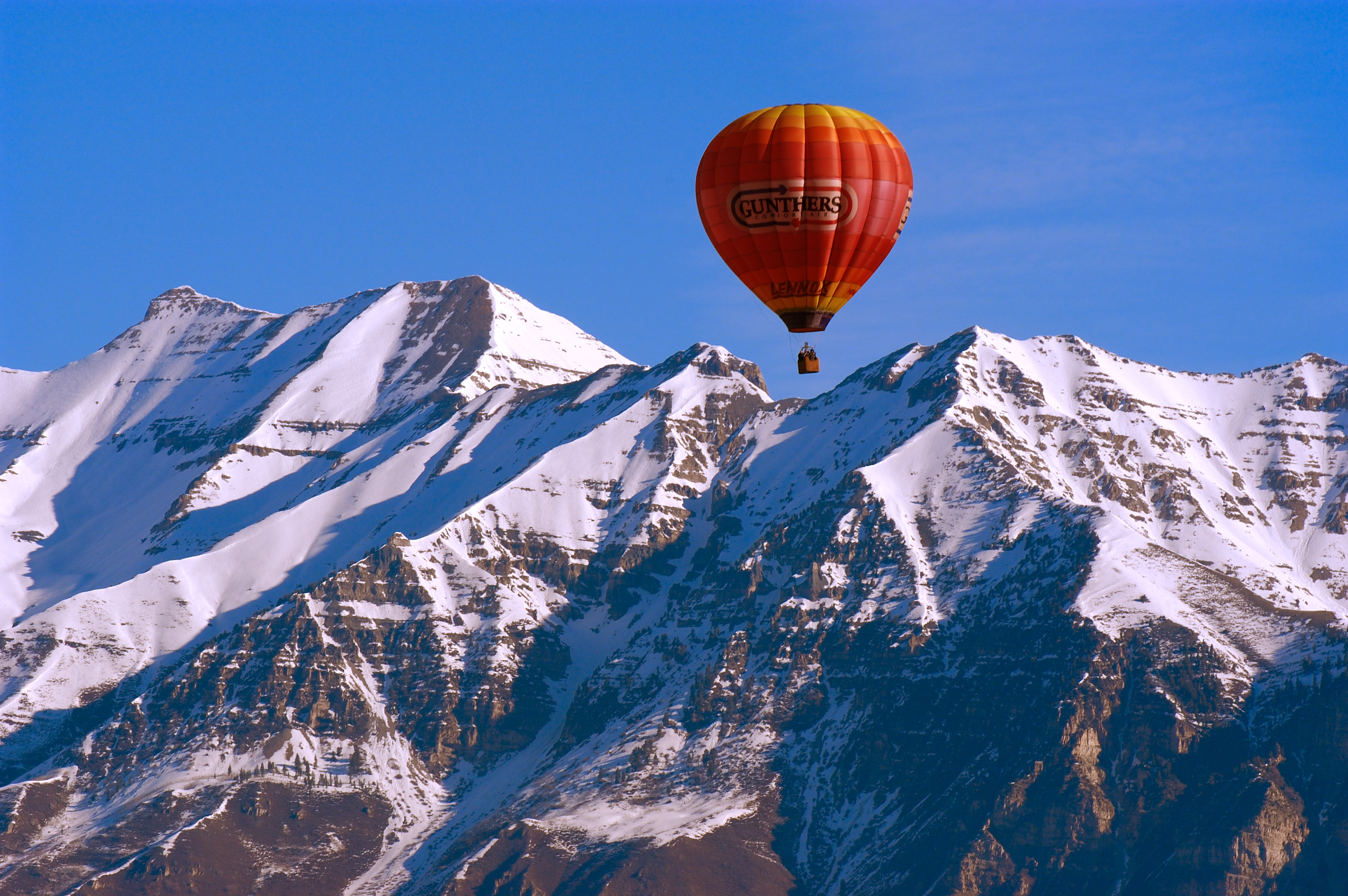
Mount Timpanogos Wilderness

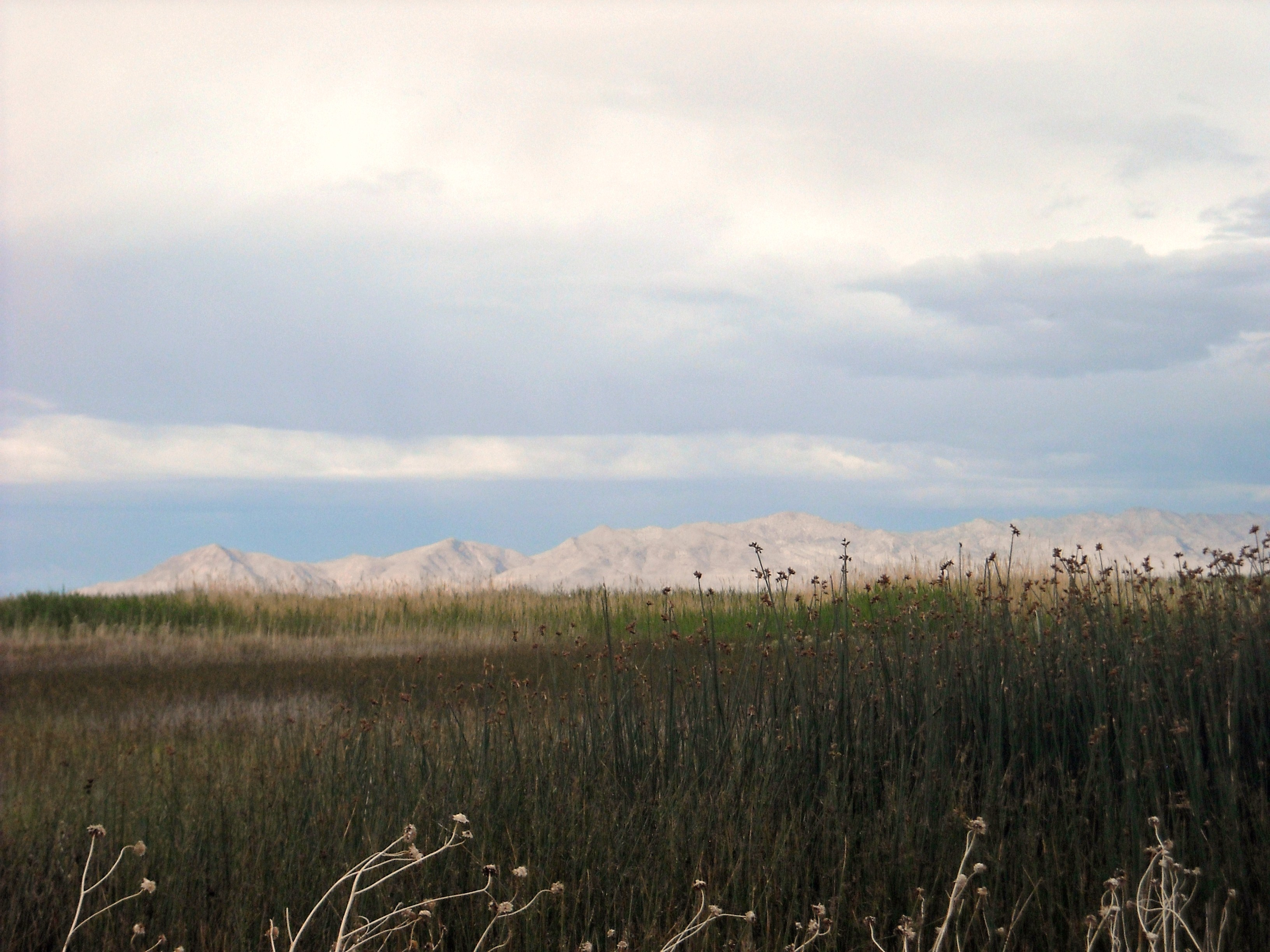
Fish Springs National Wildlife Refuge

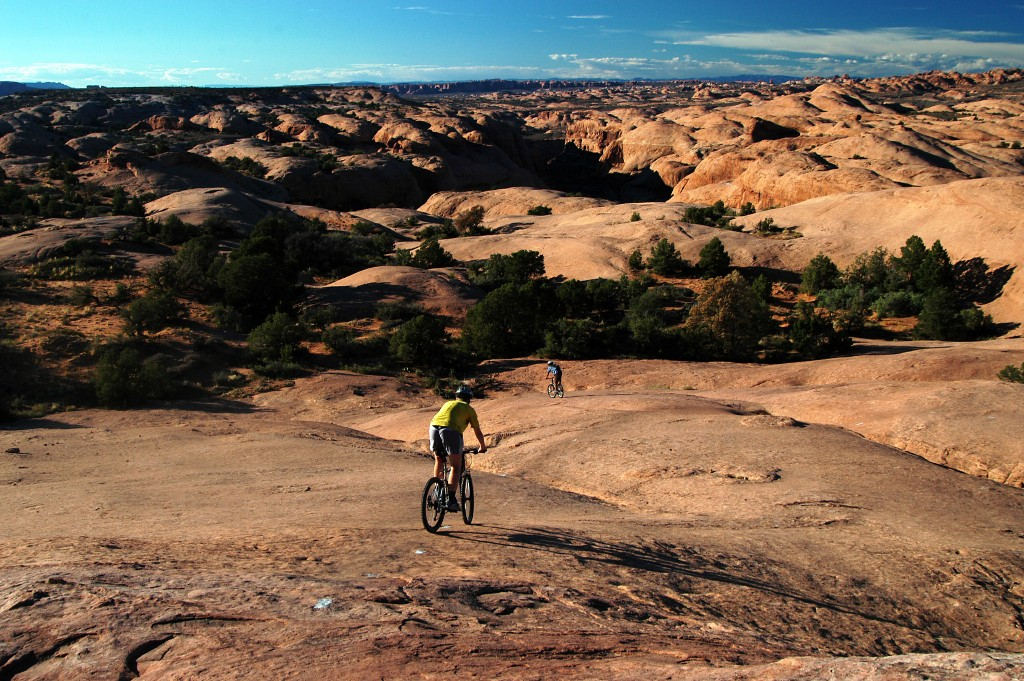
Mountain Bikers on slickrock bike trail on the Moab Slickrock Bike National Recreation Trail

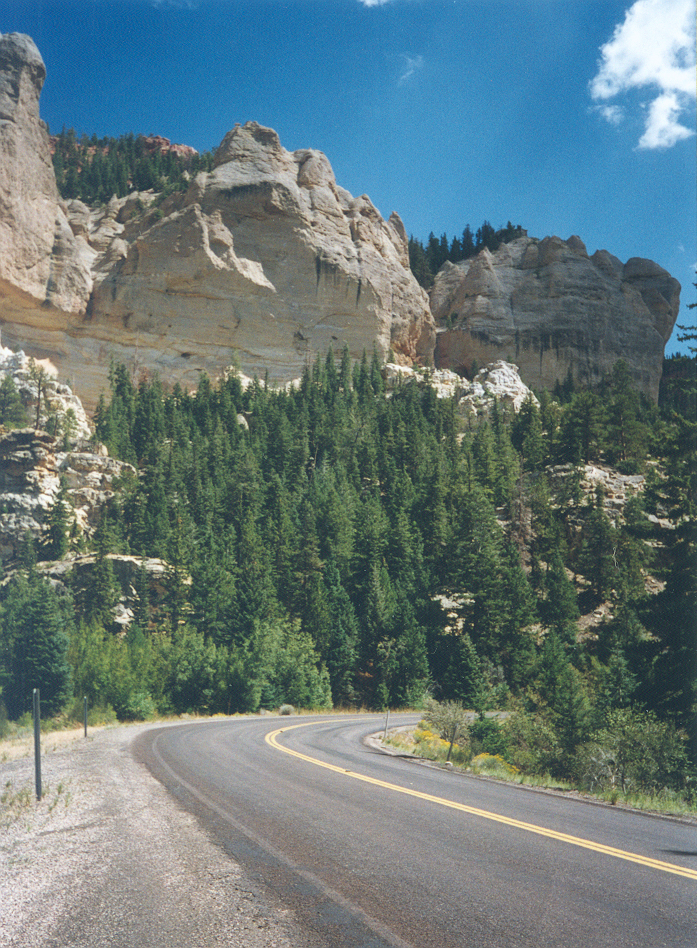
The road reveals rugged white cliffs and thick forest stands on the way from Parowan at the Brian Head-Panguitch Lake National Scenic Byway

== See also ==
- List of Utah Scenic Byways
- List of Utah State Parks
- State of Utah
- Utah Transfer of Public Lands Act
