= Woodbury (name) =

Woodbury is a given name and surname. Notable people with the name include:

Given name

- Woodbury Kane (1859–1905), American yachtsman, bon vivant and soldier
- Woodbury Langdon (1739–1805), American merchant, statesman and justice

Surname

- Angus M. Woodbury (1886–1964), American biologist
- Austin Woodbury (1899–1979), Australian Catholic philosopher
- Bruce L. Woodbury (born 1944), American politician and lawyer
- Charles Herbert Woodbury (1864–1942), American painter
- Charles Johnson Woodbury (1844–1927), American lecturer on poetry and literature
- Charles L. Woodbury (1820–1898), American lawyer and politician
- Cliff Woodbury (1894–1984), American racecar driver
- David B. Woodbury (1839–1879), American Civil War photographer
- Daniel Phineas Woodbury (1812–1864), American soldier and engineer
- Dixon M. Woodbury (1921–1991) American epilepsy researcher
- Egburt E. Woodbury (c. 1860–1920), New York State Attorney General 1915–1917
- Ellen Woodbury, animator and sculptor
- Eri D. Woodbury (1837–1928), Union Army officer during the American Civil War
- Frank B. Woodbury (1867–1962), American leader The Church of Jesus Christ of Latter-day Saints
- Gordon Woodbury (1863–1924), United States Assistant Secretary of the Navy from 1920 to 1921
- Hanni Woodbury, German-American linguist and anthropologist
- Isaac B. Woodbury (1819–1858), American composer and publisher of church music
- Joan Woodbury (1915–1989), American actress
- Levi Woodbury (1789–1851), American Associate Justice on the United States Supreme Court
- Max A. Woodbury, American mathematician
- Michael Woodbury, American convicted serial killer
- Peter Woodbury (1899–1970), American judge
- Richard B. Woodbury (1917–2009), American archeologist
- Richard G. Woodbury (born 1961), American politician from Maine
- Tory Woodbury (born 1978), American football player
- Urban A. Woodbury (1838–1915), American politician
- Walter B. Woodbury (1834–1885), British inventor and pioneering photographer
- Wendall Woodbury (1942–2010), American television journalist and news anchor
- Woody Woodbury (born 1924), American comedian, actor and television personality
