= Walter Woodbury =

Walter Woodbury may refer to:

- Walter B. Woodbury, English inventor and photographer
- J. Walter Woodbury, American biologist
