= Woodbury Township, Pennsylvania =

Woodbury Township is the name of some places in the U.S. state of Pennsylvania:

- Woodbury Township, Bedford County, Pennsylvania
- Woodbury Township, Blair County, Pennsylvania

== See also ==
- North Woodbury Township, Pennsylvania
- South Woodbury Township, Pennsylvania
- Woodbury Township (disambiguation)
- Wood Township, Pennsylvania
- Woodcock Township, Pennsylvania
- Woodward Township, Lycoming County, Pennsylvania
