= Woodbury House =

Woodbury House may refer to:

- Woodbury-Story House, Altadena, California, listed on the National Register of Historic Places (NRHP)
- Woodbury House (Denver, Colorado), a Denver Landmark
- Joseph A. Woodbury House, Greeley, Colorado, NRHP-listed in Weld County
- Peter Woodbury House, Beverly, Massachusetts, NRHP-listed in Essex County
- Woodbury House (Anoka, Minnesota), NRHP-listed in Anoka County
- Levi Woodbury Homestead, Francetown, New Hampshire, NRHP-listed in Hillsborough County
- Woodbury Friends' Meetinghouse, Woodbury, New Jersey, NRHP-listed in Gloucester County
- Woodbury (Leetown, West Virginia), NRHP-listed in Jefferson County
- Woodbury House (Woodbury, New York), a former Gold Coast Era mansion
