= Max A. Woodbury =

American mathematician (1917–2010)

Max Atkin Woodbury (1917–2010) was an American mathematician. He was born in St George, Utah to Angus Munn Woodbury and Grace (Atkin) Woodbury. He had three brothers and two sisters, including the biologists Dixon Miles Woodbury and John Walter Woodbury.

== Career ==
He received his Bachelor of Science from the University of Utah in 1939, Master of Science from the University of Michigan in 1941 and metrology at Massachusetts Institute of Technology. He obtained his doctorate at the University of Michigan in 1948 advised by Arthur Herbert Copeland. His dissertation was entitled Probability and Expected Values.

He was a member of the faculty, University of Michigan 1947-1949, Institute for Advanced Study in Princeton 1949-1950, member of faculty Princeton University 1950-1952. He moved to be an associate professor in statistics at the University of Pennsylvania from 1952-1954. After a brief leave at the Office of Naval Research 1954-1956, he became faculty at New York University from 1956-1965, then a professor of computer science and biomathematics at Duke University. He became an emeritus professor at Duke, but continued to take an active role in research for many years.

== Woodbury identity ==
The Woodbury matrix identity used in linear algebra is named after him. The related Sherman–Morrison formula is a special case of the formula, with the term Sherman-Morrison-Woodbury sometimes used. An early overview of some of its uses has been given by Hager, see also the book "Woodbury Matrix Identity". These methods are taught in many mathematics courses on linear algebra.

== Awards ==
- Fellow, 1960, American Statistical Association
- Honored Fellow, Institute of Mathematical Statistics
