= Woodbury, New York =

Woodbury is the name of some places in the U.S. state of New York:

- Woodbury, Nassau County, New York, on Long Island
- Woodbury, Orange County, New York, in the Hudson Valley

== See also ==
- Woodbury (disambiguation)
