= Woodbury Common =

Woodbury Common may refer to:

- Woodbury Common, Devon, an area of common land near Woodbury, Devon, England
- Woodbury Common Premium Outlets, an outlet center near Central Valley, New York, United States
