= Angus M. Woodbury =

American zoologist and ecologist

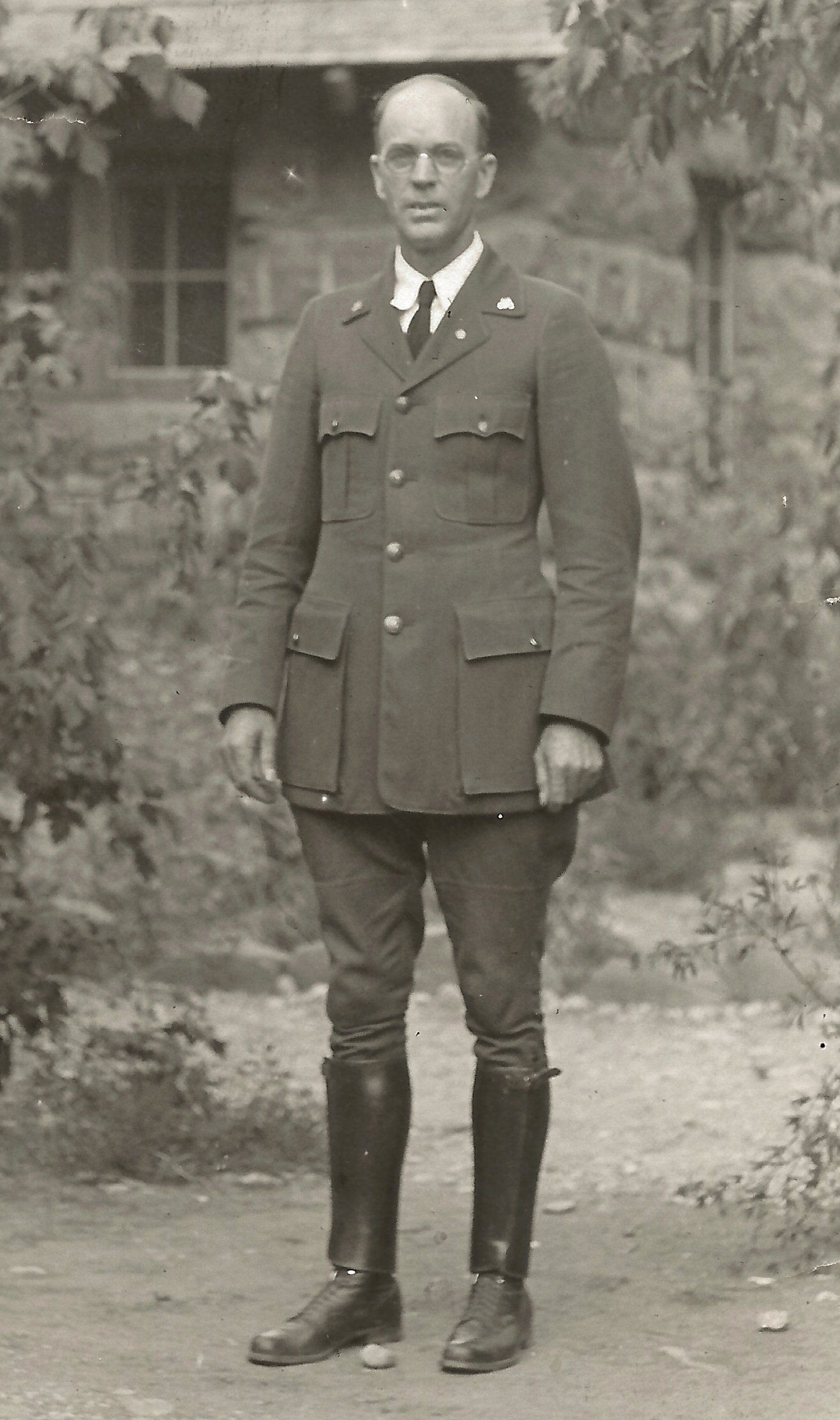
- Woodbury in 1925 at Zion National Park
- Born: July 11, 1886; St. George, Utah
- Died: August 1, 1964 (aged 78); Loveland, Colorado
- Education: University of California, Berkeley (PhD, 1931); University of Utah (M.S., 1928); Brigham Young University (B.S., 1927)
- Spouse: Grace Atkin Woodbury
- Scientific career
- Fields: Zoology, Ecology
- Workplaces: University of Utah; National Park Service; U.S. Forest Service
- Thesis: Biotic relationships of Zion Canyon, Utah, with special reference to succession. (1931)

Angus Munn Woodbury (July 11, 1886 – August 1, 1964) was an American zoologist and ecologist from Utah. He was professor at the University of Utah for over 20 years, and also worked for many years as a ranger-naturalist at Zion National Park. He produced over 100 publications, many focused on the biology of reptiles and birds, but also on insects, ecological succession, and the history of Utah. He and his wife of 55 years, Grace Atkin Woodbury, died in an automobile collision on August 1, 1964, near Loveland, Colorado.

== Early life ==
Angus Woodbury was born July 11, 1886, in St. George, Utah, to parents John Taylor and Mary Evans Woodbury. His elementary education was divided between Salt Lake City, where his father taught at LDS College, and St. George. He attended Brigham Young High School in Provo, graduating after two years in 1906.

== Career ==
Woodbury was hired by the U.S. Forest Service in 1908 and worked there until 1920. His duties included working to establish boundaries of Dixie National Forest and managing grazing and logging. From 1920 to 1926 he took courses at Dixie College, where he also served as a teaching assistant. In 1925 he became the first ranger-naturalist hired at Zion National Park, where he worked each summer until 1933, establishing the periodical Zion-Bryce Nature Notes.

From 1926 to 1927 Woodbury attended Brigham Young University, earning a B.S. in zoology. From 1927 to 1928 he attended the University of Utah, completing an M.S. degree focused on the reptiles of Utah. After graduating he joined the University of Utah faculty, teaching for the 1928–29 academic year before taking leave to obtain a Ph.D. at the University of California, Berkeley, which he completed in 1931. He returned to the University of Utah in 1931 and remained there until retirement in 1952, after which he continued to be active in research and administration.

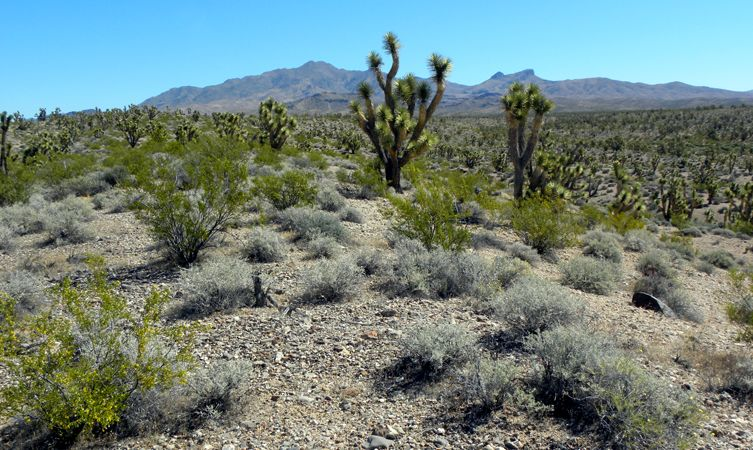
The Woodbury Desert Study Area, southwestern Utah

Woodbury's research specialized in reptiles and birds of Utah, especially wintering behavior of snakes and tortoises and the geographic distribution of birds. In 1949, he published along with Ross Hardy a "classic study" on the biology of wild desert tortoises: professor Peter Alagona of UC Santa Barbara writes, "Their paper provided key insights into the species' physiology, life history and ecology, and it served as a basis for subsequent research into tortoise evolutionary biology, biogeography, and epidemiology." In 1977, the area where Woodbury and Hardy studied was designated the Woodbury Desert Study Area by the Bureau of Land Management, and is now a part of the Beaver Dam Wash National Conservation Area.

Woodbury was a fellow of the American Association for the Advancement of Science, the American Ornithological Union, the Herpetological League, and the Utah Academy of Science, Arts and Letters. He supervised the graduate research of nine students who studied birds. Species named for him include the water bug Ambrysus woodburyi and a subspecies of chisel-toothed kangaroo rat, Dipodomys microps woodburyi.

== Personal life and family ==
Woodbury married Grace Atkin on January 15, 1909. (Note: Grace Atkin's sister, Annie Atkin, was married to Utah biologist Vasco M. Tanner.) The couple had four sons and two daughters: sons Lowell Angus, Dixon Miles, and John Walter all obtained Ph.D.s in biology, while son Max Atkin Woodbury obtained a Ph.D. in mathematics. Daughters Marian and Edith Rae both married biology Ph.Ds.

Angus and Grace Woodbury were both killed in a head-on car collision on August 1, 1964, one mile north of Loveland, Colorado.

== Books ==
- A History of Southern Utah and its National Parks. Salt Lake City: Utah State Historical Society. 1950.
- Principles of General Ecology. New York: McGraw-Hill Book Co. 1954. 503 pp.
- Comfort for Survival: In Nature and Man. New York: Vantage Press. 1957. 104 pp.
- Reminiscences of Ann Cannon Woodbury. Salt Lake City: Self-published. 1963.
