= Henry St. George Tucker Sr. =

American judge, professor and politician (1780–1848)

Henry St. George Tucker
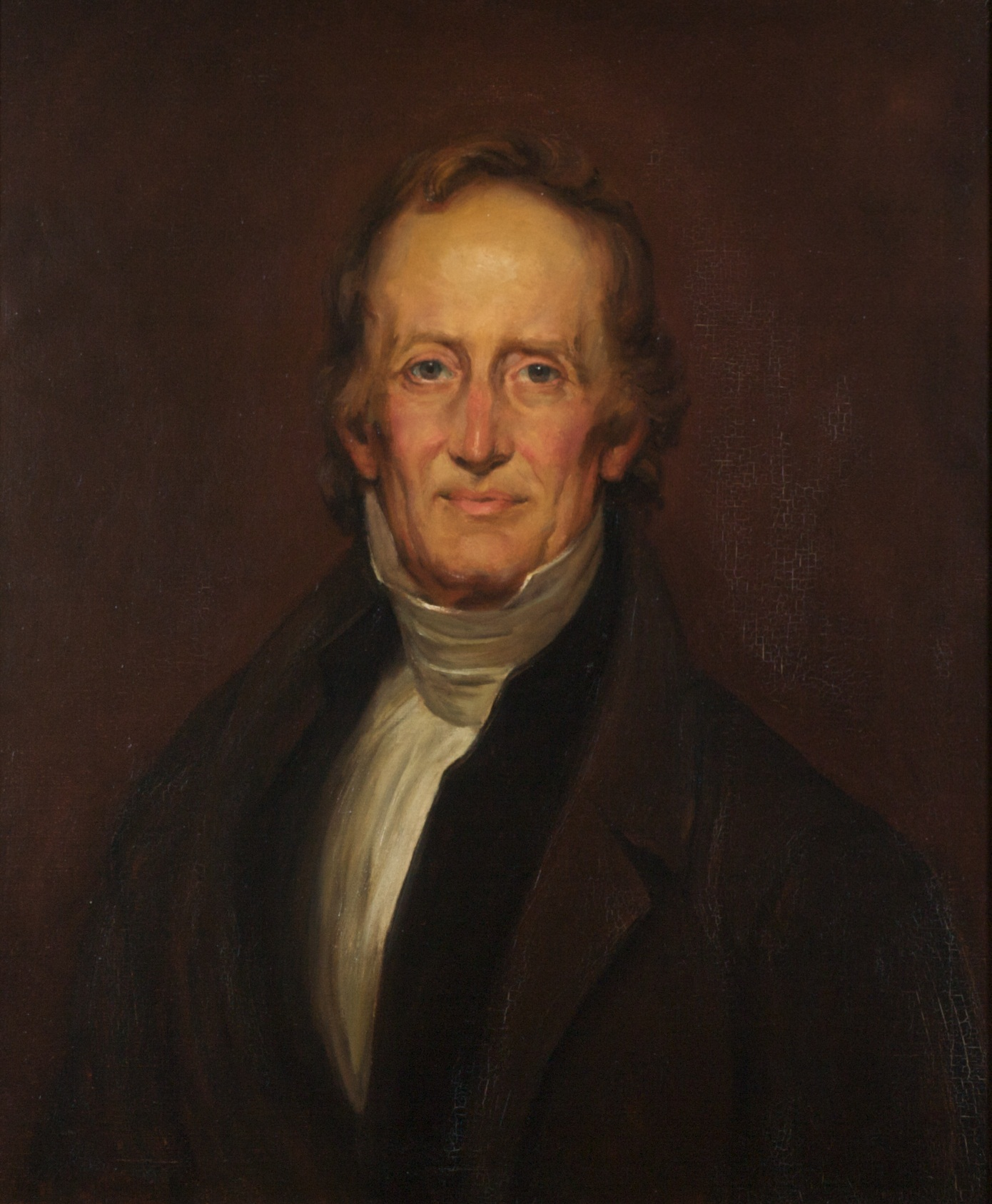
- Posthumous portrait, c. 1938

President of the Virginia Supreme Court of Appeals
- In office March 1831 – 1841
- Preceded by: Francis T. Brooke
- Succeeded by: William H. Cabell

Member of the Virginia Senate
- In office 1819–1823

Member of the U.S. House of Representatives from Virginia's 3rd district
- In office March 4, 1815 – March 3, 1819
- Preceded by: John Smith
- Succeeded by: Jared Williams

Chairman of the House Committee on Expenditures on Public Buildings
- In office March 4, 1817 – March 3, 1819
- Preceded by: Lewis Condict
- Succeeded by: Henry Meigs

Chairman of the House Committee on the District of Columbia
- In office March 4, 1815 – March 3, 1817
- Preceded by: John Dawson
- Succeeded by: John Carlyle Herbert

Personal details
- Born: Henry St. George Tucker; December 29, 1780 Mattoax Plantation, Chesterfield County, Virginia
- Died: August 28, 1848 (aged 67) Winchester, Virginia
- Party: Democratic-Republican
- Education: College of William and Mary
- Profession: lawyer, professor

Military service
- Allegiance: United States of America
- Rank: Captain
- Battles/wars: War of 1812

Henry St. George Tucker Sr. (December 29, 1780 – August 28, 1848) was an American judge, professor and politician.

== Biography ==
Tucker was born on Mattoax Plantation in Chesterfield County, Virginia on December 29, 1780, to St. George Tucker and Frances Bland, the daughter of Theodorick Bland of Cawsons. He was thus the half-brother through his mother of U.S. Representative and Senator John Randolph of Roanoke. As a young man, he pursued classical studies at the College of William & Mary; he graduated in 1798. Tucker stayed in Williamsburg, Virginia to study law at William and Mary as well as under his father who was an established Virginia lawyer. He excelled in the study of law, obtaining his law degree in 1801. After being admitted to the Virginia bar, Tucker commenced a legal practice in Winchester, Virginia.

Notably, Tucker was appointed to the law faculty at the College of William & Mary (1801–1804) and later was captain of Cavalry in the War of 1812. He was elected as a Democratic-Republican to the U.S. House of Representatives and served for two terms, from 1815 to 1819. During his tenure, Tucker was a supporter of the American System, including the establishment of the Second Bank of the United States and the passage of the Tariff of 1816. In 1823 he had a son, John Randolph Tucker. From 1824 to 1831 he operated the Winchester Law School. He went on to be judge and president of the Court of Appeals of Virginia (1831–1841) and then became a professor of law at the University of Virginia (1841 to 1845). He was chairman of faculty at the university from 1842 until 1845.

As a law professor, Tucker authored Commentaries on the Law of Virginia as well as several treatises on natural law and on the formation of the Constitution of the United States. He is widely known for adding a mandatory pledge to the student honor code while a professor at the University of Virginia. On July 4, 1842, St. George Tucker offered the following resolution as a gesture of confidence in students: "...resolved, that in all future examinations ... each candidate shall attach to the written answers ... a certificate of the following words: I, A.B., do hereby certify on my honor that I have derived no assistance during the time of this examination from any source whatsoever." Tucker's pledge was adopted and soon became the following: "I do hereby certify on honor that I have derived no assistance during the time of this examination from any source whatever, whether oral, written or in print." This basic pledge has, in one form or another, been adopted at many American universities.

Tucker resigned in July, 1845 due to ill health. He died in Winchester, Virginia in 1848.

== Electoral history ==
- 1815; Tucker was elected to the U.S. House of Representatives with 71.5% of the vote, defeating Federalist Griffin Taylor and Independent Robert Bailey.
- 1817; Tucker was re-elected with 67.84% of the vote, defeating fellow Democratic-Republican William Carlson.

== Legacy and honors ==
- The papers of the Tucker-Coleman family, including the papers of Henry St. George Tucker, are held by the Special Collections Research Center at the College of William & Mary.
- His home near Leetown, West Virginia, known as Woodbury, was listed on the National Register of Historic Places in 1974.
- Tucker County, West Virginia is named in his honor.

== Works ==
- Commentaries on the Law of Virginia (2 vols., Winchester, 1836–1837)
- Lectures on Constitutional Law (Richmond, 1843)
- Lectures on Natural Law and Government (Charlottesville, 1844)

== Notes ==
Legal offices
Preceded by Francis T. Brooke	President of the Virginia Supreme Court of Appeals; 1831–1841	Succeeded by William H. Cabell
U.S. House of Representatives
Preceded by John Smith	Member of the U.S. House of Representatives from Virginia's 3rd congressional district 1815–1819	Succeeded by Jared Williams
Political offices
Preceded by Lewis Condict; New Jersey	Chairman of House Expenditures on Public Buildings Committee; 1817–1819	Succeeded by Henry Meigs; New York
Preceded by John Dawson; Virginia	Chairman of House Committee on the District of Columbia; 1815–1817	Succeeded by John Carlyle Herbert; Virginia
