= Woodbury Township =

Woodbury Township may refer to:

- Woodbury Township, Cumberland County, Illinois
- Woodbury Township, Woodbury County, Iowa
- Woodbury Township, Stutsman County, North Dakota, in Stutsman County, North Dakota
- Woodbury Township, Bedford County, Pennsylvania
- Woodbury Township, Blair County, Pennsylvania

== See also ==
- Woodbury (disambiguation)
