= Doc's Pass Wilderness =

Protected area in Utah, United States

- IUCN category Ib (wilderness area)
- Location within Utah Location within the United States
- Location: Washington County, Utah, USA
- Nearest city: Gunlock, UT
- Coordinates: 37.39433371°N 114.022473024°W
- Area: 17,294 acres (70.0 km^{2})
- Established: March 30, 2009
- Governing body: Bureau of Land Management

Doc's Pass Wilderness is a 17,294-acre (70.0 km^{2}) wilderness area in the US state of Utah. It was designated March 30, 2009, as part of the Omnibus Public Land Management Act of 2009. Located adjacent to Nevada in the northwestern corner of Washington County, it protects a portion of the Bull Valley Mountains and the watershed of five miles of a perennial, free-flowing stream within Beaver Dam Wash. This stream provides habitat for a wide range of native fish, and the riparian zone supports numerous mammals.

Doc's Pass Wilderness is located near Cougar Canyon Wilderness and Slaughter Creek Wilderness, only separated by a road, and is part of the extended Zion Wilderness landscape.

== See also ==
- List of U.S. Wilderness Areas
- Wilderness Act
