= Woodbury High School =

Woodbury High School may refer to schools in the United States:

- Monroe-Woodbury High School in Central Valley, New York
- Woodbury Central High School in Moville, Iowa
- Woodbury High School (Minnesota)
- Woodbury Junior-Senior High School in Woodbury, New Jersey
- Woodbury Mennonite Church School in Woodbury, Pennsylvania (grades 1–10 only)
