= Woodbury House (Woodbury, New York) =

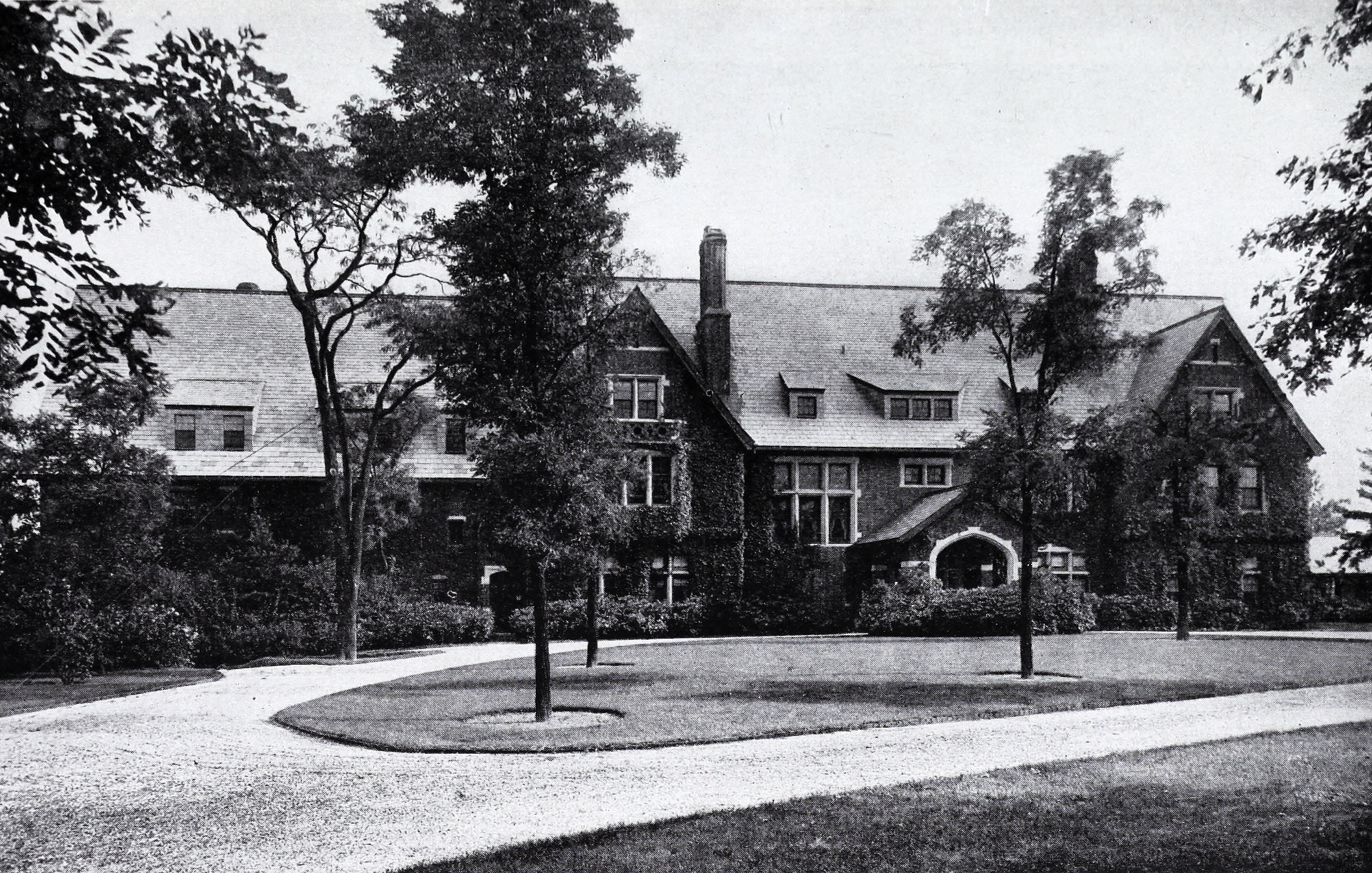
- Mansion as pictured in October of 1919.

General information
- Location: Woodbury, United States of America
- Cost: more than $300,000
- Owner: Town of Oyster Bay

The Woodbury House was the estate of James Watson Webb II. It was built in 1915 by Cross & Cross. It is located in Woodbury, New York.

== History ==
=== Site ===
The land where the Woodbury house would eventually get built, used to be farmland that was owned by Piquet and Robbins. When they cashed out in 1913, they sold all 222 acres to James Watson Webb II, at the request of wife, Electra Havemeyer. There, they would commission Cross & Cross to build a 40-room mansion. Louisine Havemeyer and Lila Vanderbilt also contributed to the design of the building. Completed in 1914, the English-style Woodbury house would boast 13 master-sized bedrooms, 13 baths, a reflecting pool, an enclosed rear porch, an upper balcony made up of stone, and indoor toilets. Along the mansion, Webb set aside several acres to use as a farm in order to avoid taxation levied on estate property by the newly formed Nassau County. Other notable features included a duck pond and a deep hollow. It was here that Webb and Havemeyer would raise four children. However, James Watson Webb II would eventually join the US Army, leaving Electra Havemeyer to spend more time at their Vermont house.

In 1921, Edward Richmond Tinker would purchase the home and most land after winning the auction with $162,000. Webb would reserve 74 acres for himself. Tinker would use this new property to expand his General Farms & Realty Corporation, in order to distribute poultry to the rest of Long Island.

=== Suburban development ===
By the end of the 1950s, Long Island had exploded in population, and thus became a desired spot for industries. real estate developer Gilbert Tilles would purchase the house and land in 1961, with ideas of turning it into an industrial park, known as Crossways. However, long-time residents of the surrounding area, already troubled by the exponential pace of industrial and residential growth within the Syosset-Woodbury area, strongly opposed the idea. To ensure approval by the Town of Oyster Bay, Tilles would reach a compromise, donating 46 acres for the construction of a new community park, the Syosset-Woodbury Community Park.

=== Usage in the Syosset-Woodbury Community Park ===
Following the opening of the park on Memorial Day weekend, 1964, the mansion would become a community center for chess, billiards, and dancing. However, by the end of the 1980s, the cost of maintaining the Woodbury House, was too much for the Town of Oyster Bay, so they had to retire the place as a community center. Currently, the Woodbury house acts as an athletic storage, as well as a carpentry shop.
