= Beaver Dam Wash =

Seasonal stream in Utah, Nevada, and Arizona

Coordinates: 37°00′00″N 113°59′36″W

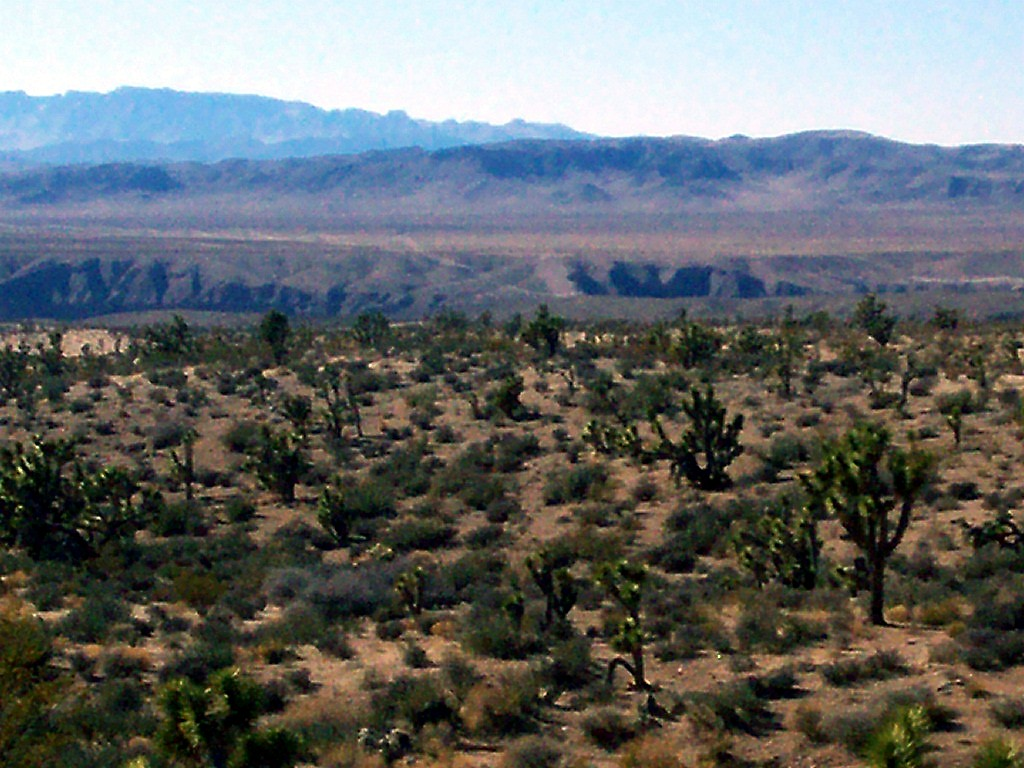
The Beaver Dam Wash area on the Utah/Arizona border has the Utah state low point of 2,179.9 ft (664.4 m) at 37.00018N and 114.00133W.

The Beaver Dam Wash is a seasonal stream near the southwestern Utah-Nevada border in the United States. At its southern end in northern Arizona, near the point where it empties into the Virgin River, the stream flows throughout the year. Part of the wash is in the Beaver Dam Wash National Conservation Area, managed by the Bureau of Land Management. The wash was so named on account of beaver dams which once were built on its course.

The wash occupies a transition zone among the Colorado Plateau, the Great Basin, and the Mojave Desert ecosystems. Like all such zones, this area supports diverse vegetative communities and a rich array of wildlife. The wash begins in the Clover Mountains in Lincoln County, Nevada and flows south across very sparsely populated desert terrain. The area around the wash, including several protected wilderness areas, includes forests of Joshua trees along with other yuccas, cholla cactus, barrel cactus, Mormon Tea, and other grasses and shrubs, the primary vegetation in the area.

Animal life in the area consists of a variety of lizards, mammals, birds, insects, and other creatures found in the Mojave Desert. The lower elevations provide designated critical habitat for the threatened desert tortoise and other native species, such as desert bighorn sheep, gila monster, and mojave rattlesnake.

Winters are mild, with temperatures reaching highs from the mid-50s to 60s degrees Fahrenheit (+10s degrees Celsius). Winter lows are usually in the 20s to high 30s Fahrenheit (-0s degrees Celsius). Summer highs are commonly over 100 °F (38 °C) with lows in the mid-80s Fahrenheit (30s degrees Celsius).

Flash floods are common in the area when heavy summer monsoon thunderstorms dump heavy amounts of rain in short times, causing water to fill washes and gulleys in the area. Most precipitation comes in concentrated storms that are infrequent. Generally, the air is low in humidity and dry. Windy conditions also are common throughout the year.

At 2,179 feet (664 m) elevation, Beaver Dam Wash is the lowest point in the state of Utah.

Climate data for St. George, Utah, 1991–2020 normals, extremes 1893–present
Month	Jan	Feb	Mar	Apr	May	Jun	Jul	Aug	Sep	Oct	Nov	Dec	Year
Record high °F (°C)	80 (27)	81 (27)	96 (36)	97 (36)	110 (43)	113 (45)	116 (47)	113 (45)	110 (43)	101 (38)	87 (31)	75 (24)	116 (47)
Mean maximum °F (°C)	68 (20)	74 (23)	82 (28)	90 (32)	99 (37)	106 (41)	110 (43)	107 (42)	102 (39)	92 (33)	78 (26)	67 (19)	111 (44)
Mean daily maximum °F (°C)	57.7 (14.3)	60.7 (15.9)	68.8 (20.4)	77.0 (25.0)	87.3 (30.7)	95.3 (35.2)	102.2 (39.0)	100.2 (37.9)	93.2 (34.0)	79.4 (26.3)	65.0 (18.3)	56.3 (13.5)	78.6 (25.9)
Daily mean °F (°C)	41.2 (5.1)	45.8 (7.7)	53.4 (11.9)	60.4 (15.8)	70.5 (21.4)	80.4 (26.9)	86.8 (30.4)	85.1 (29.5)	76.5 (24.7)	63.0 (17.2)	49.2 (9.6)	40.4 (4.7)	62.7 (17.1)
Mean daily minimum °F (°C)	28.3 (−2.1)	31.3 (−0.4)	35.8 (2.1)	40.8 (4.9)	49.4 (9.7)	55.1 (12.8)	61.8 (16.6)	60.3 (15.7)	53.5 (11.9)	42.5 (5.8)	31.9 (−0.1)	26.1 (−3.3)	43.1 (6.1)
Mean minimum °F (°C)	17 (−8)	21 (−6)	26 (−3)	31 (−1)	38 (3)	46 (8)	55 (13)	52 (11)	43 (6)	31 (−1)	21 (−6)	16 (−9)	12 (−11)
Record low °F (°C)	−7 (−22)	1 (−17)	16 (−9)	21 (−6)	24 (−4)	32 (0)	43 (6)	41 (5)	28 (−2)	21 (−6)	7 (−14)	−1 (−18)	−7 (−22)
Average precipitation inches (mm)	1.49 (38)	1.94 (49)	1.42 (36)	0.69 (18)	0.33 (8.4)	0.22 (5.6)	0.60 (15)	0.64 (16)	0.54 (14)	0.89 (23)	0.60 (15)	1.07 (27)	10.43 (265)
Average snowfall inches (cm)	0.2 (0.51)	0.2 (0.51)	0.1 (0.25)	0.0 (0.0)	0.0 (0.0)	0.0 (0.0)	0.0 (0.0)	0.0 (0.0)	0.0 (0.0)	0.0 (0.0)	0.0 (0.0)	0.8 (2.0)	1.3 (3.27)
Source: WRCC(extremes 1893–present)

== See also ==
- List of rivers of Utah
- Beaver Dam State Park
- Beaver Dam Mountains Wilderness
- Doc's Pass Wilderness
- Slaughter Creek Wilderness
- Cougar Canyon Wilderness
