= Cougar Canyon Wilderness =

Protected area in Utah, United States

- IUCN category Ib (wilderness area)
- Location within Utah Location within the United States
- Location: Washington County, Utah, USA
- Nearest city: Gunlock, UT
- Coordinates: 37.4865586763°N 114.014880718°W
- Area: 10,409 acres (42.1 km^{2})
- Established: March 30, 2009
- Governing body: Bureau of Land Management

Cougar Canyon Wilderness is a 10,409-acre (42.1 km^{2}) wilderness area in the US state of Utah. It was designated March 30, 2009, as part of the Omnibus Public Land Management Act of 2009. Located adjacent to Nevada in the northwestern corner of Washington County, it protects an area of hilly juniper-pinyon woodlands bordering the Dixie National Forest.

Cougar Canyon Wilderness is located near Doc's Pass Wilderness on the south, separated by a small road, and is bordered by Slaughter Creek Wilderness on the east.

== See also ==
- Beaver Dam Wash
- List of U.S. Wilderness Areas
- Wilderness Act
