= Slaughter Creek Wilderness =

Wilderness area in Utah, United States

- IUCN category Ib (wilderness area)
- Location within the United States
- Location: Washington County, Utah, USA
- Nearest city: Gunlock, UT
- Coordinates: 37°27′23″N 113°58′00″W
- Area: 3,901 acres (15.8 km^{2})
- Established: March 30, 2009
- Governing body: Bureau of Land Management

Slaughter Creek Wilderness is a 3,901-acre (15.8 km^{2}) wilderness area in the US state of Utah. It was designated March 30, 2009, as part of the Omnibus Public Land Management Act of 2009. Located near the Nevada stateline in the northwestern corner of Washington County, it protects much of the watershed for Slaughter Creek, which feeds into the perennial streams of Beaver Dam Wash.

Slaughter Creek Wilderness is located near Doc's Pass Wilderness on the south, separated by a small road, and is bordered by Cougar Canyon Wilderness on the west.

== See also ==
- List of U.S. Wilderness Areas
- Wilderness Act
