= Woodbury Common, Devon =

Area of common land near Woodbury, Devon, England

Coordinates: 50.673°N 3.369°W

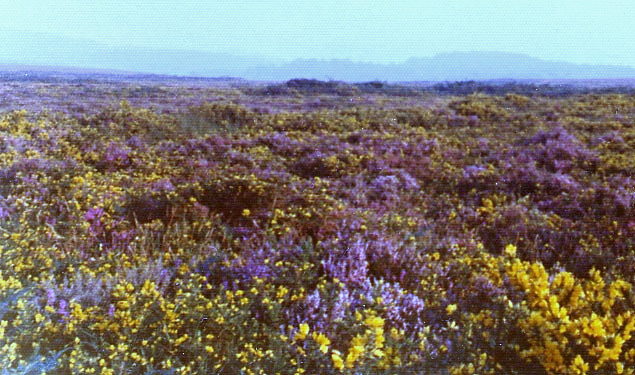
Heath at Woodbury Common, showing Heather (Calluna vulgaris) and Western Gorse (Ulex gallii) in bloom during the summer

Woodbury Common in East Devon, England is an area of common land that is predominantly heathland adjacent to the village of Woodbury. It is bordered to the south by the edge of the towns of Exmouth and Budleigh Salterton, the hamlet of Yettington to the east, and the A3052 to the north. It is part of the East Devon Area of Outstanding Natural Beauty, and is a Site of Special Scientific Interest.

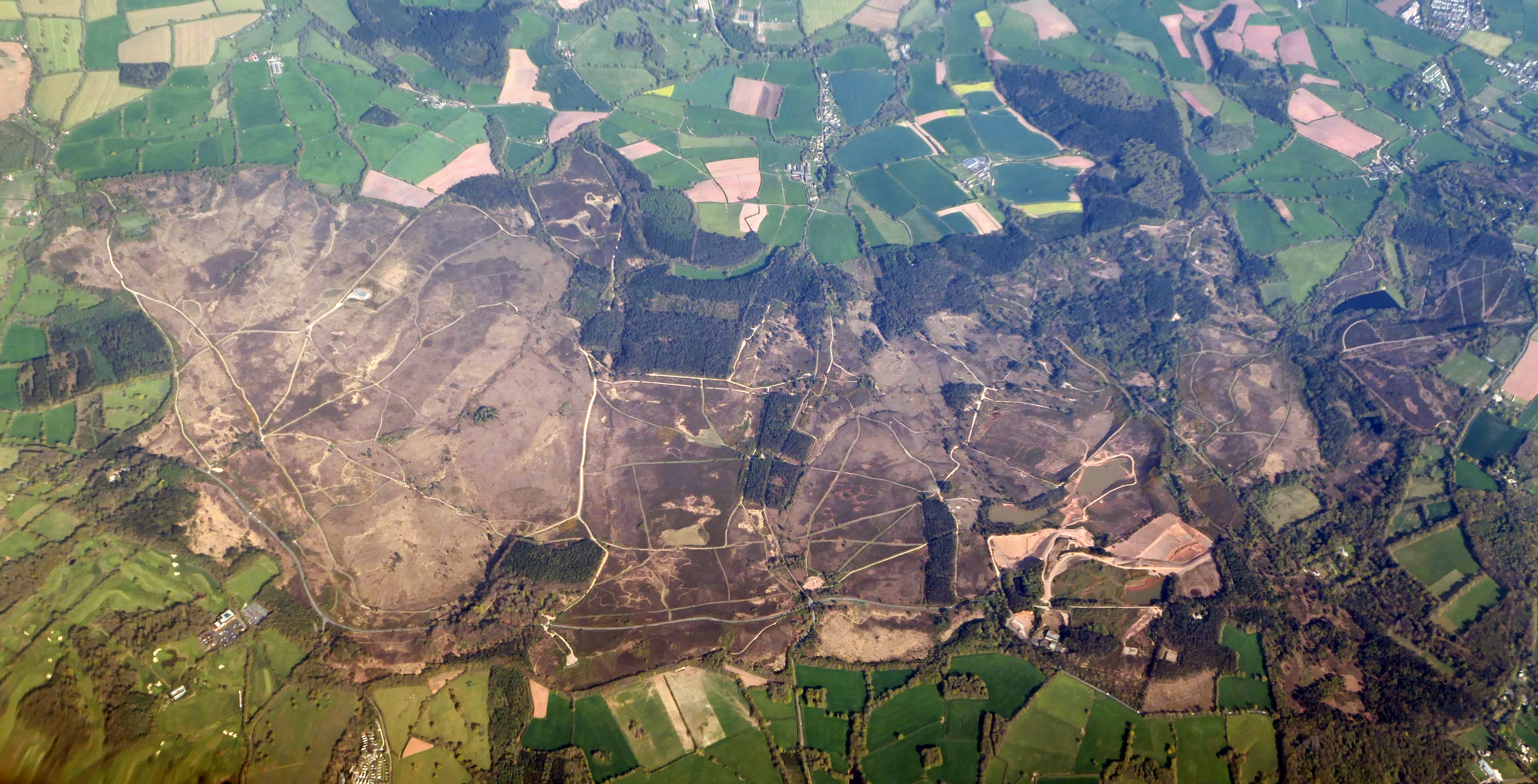
Aerial view of the common.

Within the common is Woodbury Castle, an Iron Age hill fort situated on a viewpoint overlooking westwards the villages of Woodbury and Woodbury Salterton and across the Exe estuary to the Haldon Hills, and overlooking eastwards the Otter Valley, part of the East Devon Area of Outstanding Natural Beauty.

The heathland has wide swathes of gorse and heather (bell, cross-leaved and ling varieties) and is a popular spot for orienteering, hill-walking, mountain biking and flying radio-controlled aircraft. It has a wide variety of wildlife, in particular the Nightjar, which migrates from Africa each year.

The common contains a training ground for the Royal Marines, part of the Commando Training Centre Royal Marines based at nearby Lympstone in the parish of Woodbury.

To the north end of Woodbury Common is the Woodbury Park Hotel, Golf and Country Club complex established by former Formula One driver Nigel Mansell.

== The Battle of Woodbury Common, 1549 ==
The Battle of Woodbury Common, which took place on 4 August 1549, was part of the Prayer Book Rebellion.

Reinforcements in the form of Italian mercenaries and German Landsknechts under the command of Lord William Grey arrived on 2 August to assist the king's troops under John Russell, 1st Earl of Bedford., who was charged with defeating a large force of rebelling men from Cornwall and Devon.

The next day, the king's army of some 5,000 men began a march from Honiton to relieve Exeter, which was under siege at the time, but instead of taking the heavily barricaded highway, Russell went westward, across the downs. Russell's scouts found their way barred by 2,000 men at Alfington and sent in Captain Travers to clear the road. In the words of Edward VI's chronicler, John Hayward, those Cornishmen who were disarmed in this assault were "slain like beasts". Russell's advance continued onto Woodbury Common, where he pitched camp at a windmill. Here, Paulo Batista Spinola, the Italian commander, kept his men awake all night, fearing a night attack. This actually occurred at dawn the next day, on 4 August, when Devonian and Cornish forces defending Clyst St Mary came out to confront the larger force at the windmill. The difference in numbers and force of arms did nothing to deter them and the second battle of the uprising began. There were heavy losses on both sides and the result was inconclusive but Russell's army took many prisoners, 900 of whom were executed the next day in the Clyst Heath massacre. This number was confirmed by John Hayward.
