= J. Walter Woodbury =

American electrophysiologist (1923–2017)

- Born: 7 August 1923; St. George, Utah
- Died: 29 November 2017 (aged 94); Salt Lake City, Utah
- Education: University of Utah
- Spouse: Betty Elaine Gunderson
- Awards: Fellow, AAAS (1960); Fellow, Biophysical Society (2006)
- Scientific career
- Workplaces: 1943-45 Radiation Laboratory, MIT; 1950-73 University of Washington; 1973-93 University of Utah
- Academic advisors: Henry Eyring

John Walter Woodbury (1923–2017) was an American electrophysiologist and author of the first textbook explanation of the Hodgkin-Huxley model studies of the action potential. He applied physical and mathematical techniques to experimentally elucidate the nature of electrical excitability in cells. He was also involved in the experimental and theoretical investigations of the mechanisms of ion penetration through the ion channels in muscle membranes, the regulation of cellular acid-base balance and the control of epileptic seizures by repetitive Vagus nerve stimulation.

== Biography ==
J. Walter Woodbury was born in St. George, Utah and grew up in Salt Lake City. He received a Bachelor of Science in Physics from the University of Utah in 1943, and from 1943 to 1945 was a staff member of the MIT Radiation Laboratory. Returning to the University of Utah after the end of WWII, he received a Master of Science degree in Physiology in 1947 followed by a Doctorate of Philosophy in Physiology in 1950, also from the University of Utah. In 1950 Woodbury joined the faculty of the University of Washington as an instructor in the Department of Physiology, and was promoted to Assistant Professor and elected to the American Association for the Advancement of Science in 1952. Advancing through the academic ranks he became a Full Professor in 1962, a position he held until 1973. Following a sabbatical at the University of Utah 1972–73, Woodbury accepted a position as Professor in the Department of Physiology at the University of Utah, and remained there until his retirement as Professor Emeritus in 1993, a position he held until his death. He was a son of the biologist Angus M. Woodbury.

== Work ==
In the course of his doctoral studies Woodbury published several papers and additionally spent time with Gilbert Ling at the University of Chicago learning to pull Ling-Gerard micro-electrodes and measuring the membrane potential of frog sartorius muscle.

After finishing his PhD, he joined the Physiology faculty of the University of Washington (Seattle), where he used his experience in intracellular recording to study the membrane potentials in many different types of cells: spinal cord (1952 REF 6 & 7), frog sartorius muscle (1953), uterine muscle cells (1956), pregnant uterine muscle (1954 REF 8, 11), frog ventricular muscle REF 13, human heart (1957 REF 10 & 12), and cultured chick embryo heart muscle cells. Especially important was his use of a flexibly mounted ultramicroelectrode to record intracellularly from moving tissues, such as the first ever intracellular recording from the intact beating human heart (Woodbury and Brady, Science, 1956 REF 10, 12). Although the first records are usually credited to Sir John Eccles, Woodbury and Harry D. Patton pioneered intracellular recording of mammalian spinal elements, including motoneurons,

Other professional contributions:

- Gap junction work with Wayne Crill.
- Eyring rate theory work on channel kinetics (together with Henry Eyring).
- Vagal nerve stimulation research with his brother, Dixon M. Woodbury in the last couple of his working years (funded by Cyberonics, Inc. Houston, TX)
- Continuous support as principal investigator from NIH 1956–84
- One of 40 recipients of an experimental Laboratory INstrument Computer (LINC) and its evaluation program (1963–68). LINCs were designed to facilitate neuroscience research (funded by NIH).
- Experimental and theoretical investigations of the mechanisms of ion penetration through the ion channels in muscle membranes.
- Contributing to the understanding of the regulation of cell acid-base state.
- Woodbury felt his most important contribution to neuroscience was popular elucidation of the work of Alan Hodgkin and Andrew Huxley that first appeared in (1960 edition OF RUCH AND FULTON.)

== Key Scientific Articles Published ==
1. Woodbury, L.A., Woodbury, J.W. and Hecht, H.H. Membrane resting and action potentials of single cardiac muscle fibers. Circulation 1: 264–266, 1950.
2. Woodbury, J.W. and Brady, A.J. Intracellular recording from moving tissues with a flexibly mounted ultra-microelectrode. Science 123: 100–101, 1956.
3. Woodbury, J.W., Lee, J., Brady, A.J. and Merendino, K.A. Trans¬membranal potentials from the human heart. Circulation Research 5: 179, 1957.
4. Brady, A.J. and Woodbury, J.W. The sodium-potassium hypothesis as the basis of electrical activity in frog ventricle. Journal of Physiology 154: 385–407, 1960.
5. Woodbury, J.W. and Crill, W.E. The potential in the gap between two abutting cardiac muscle cells: A closed solution. Biophysical Journal 10: 1076–1083, 1970.
6. Woodbury, J.W. Eyring rate theory model of the current-voltage relationships of ion channels in excitable membranes. In: Chemical Dynamics: Papers in Honor of Henry Eyring. New York: Wiley-Intersicence, pp. 601–617, 1971.
7. Eyring, H., Woodbury, J.W. and D'Arrigo, J.S. A molecular mechanism of general anesthesia. Anesthesiology 38: 415–424, 1973 [review].
8. Woodbury, J.W., D'Arrigo, J.S. and Eyring, H. Physiological mechanism of general anesthesia: Synaptic blockade. In: Molecular Mechanisms of Anesthesia, B.R. Fink (ed.). New York: Raven Press, 1975, pp. 53–87.
9. Woodbury, D.M and Woodbury J.W. (1990). Effects of vagal stimulation on experimentally induced seizures in rats. Epilepsia, 21(Suppl. 2): S7-S19.).
10. Woodbury, J.W. and Woodbury, D.M. (1991). Vagal stimulation reduces the severity of maximal electroshock seizures in intact rats: Use of a cuff electrode for stimulating and recording. PACE, 14:94-107.
