= Woodbury Castle =

Iron Age hill fort in Devon, England

Coordinates: 50°40′40″N 3°22′12″W

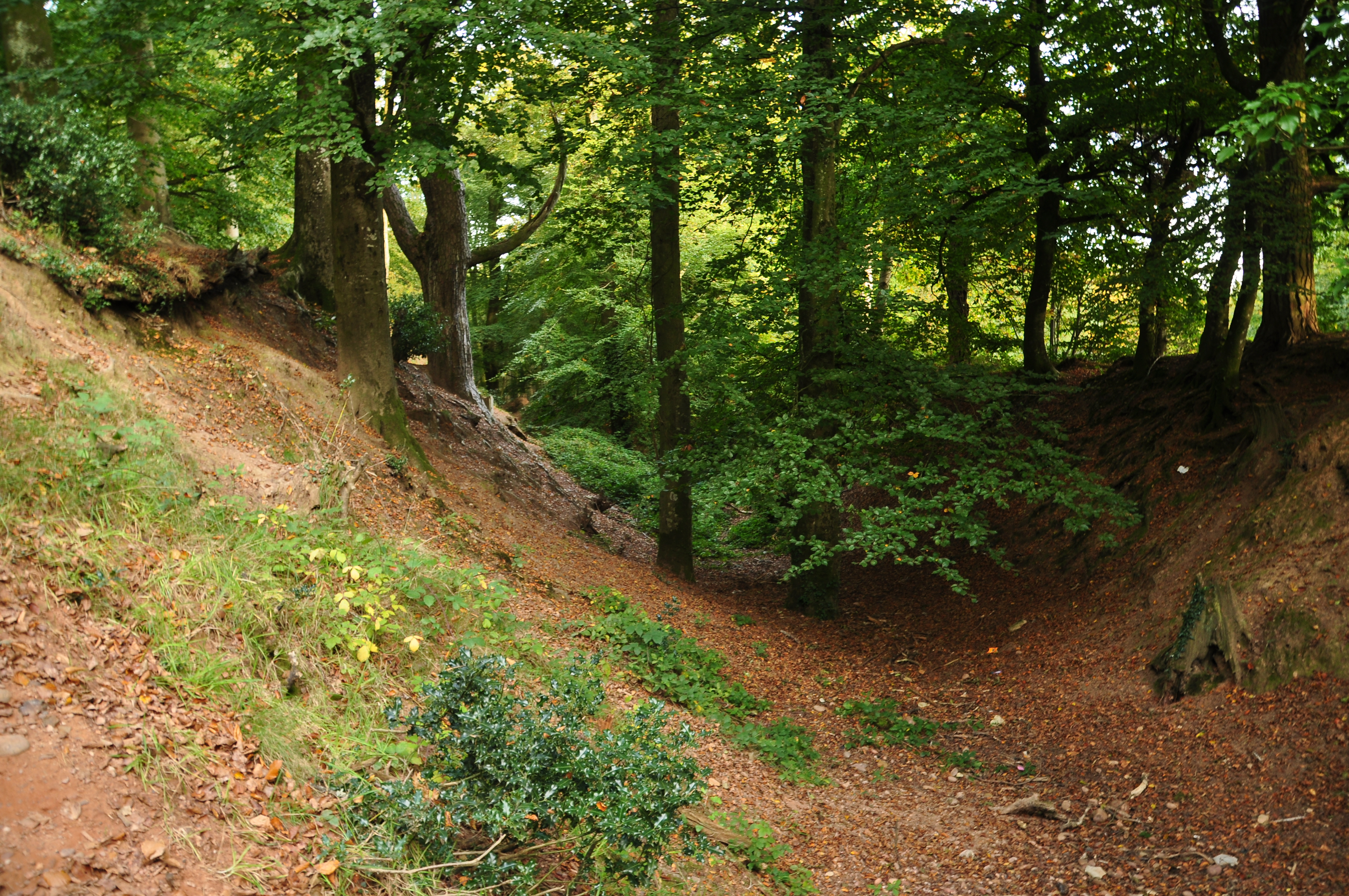
Part of the hillfort's earthworks

Woodbury Castle is an Iron Age hillfort near the village of Woodbury in the English county of Devon, some eight miles southeast of the city of Exeter.

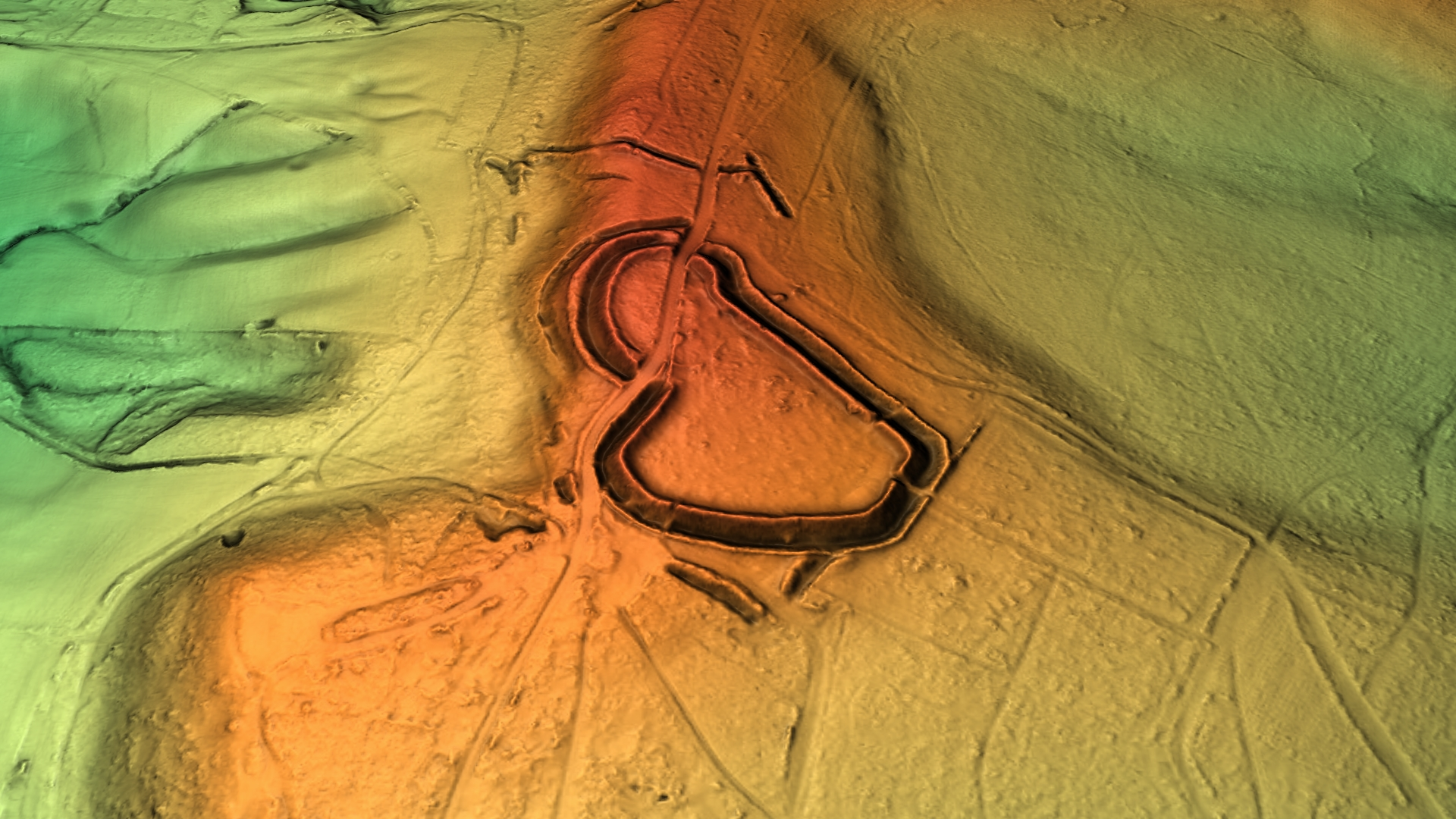
3D view of the digital terrain model

The fort is situated on a high point of Woodbury Common, at approximately 185 metres (607 ft) above sea level, in a commanding position with views up and down the Exe Estuary and across Lyme Bay in both directions. The structure is a prehistoric military type of earthwork.
