= Beaver Dam Wash National Conservation Area =

Area of Conservation in USA

- IUCN category V (protected landscape/seascape)
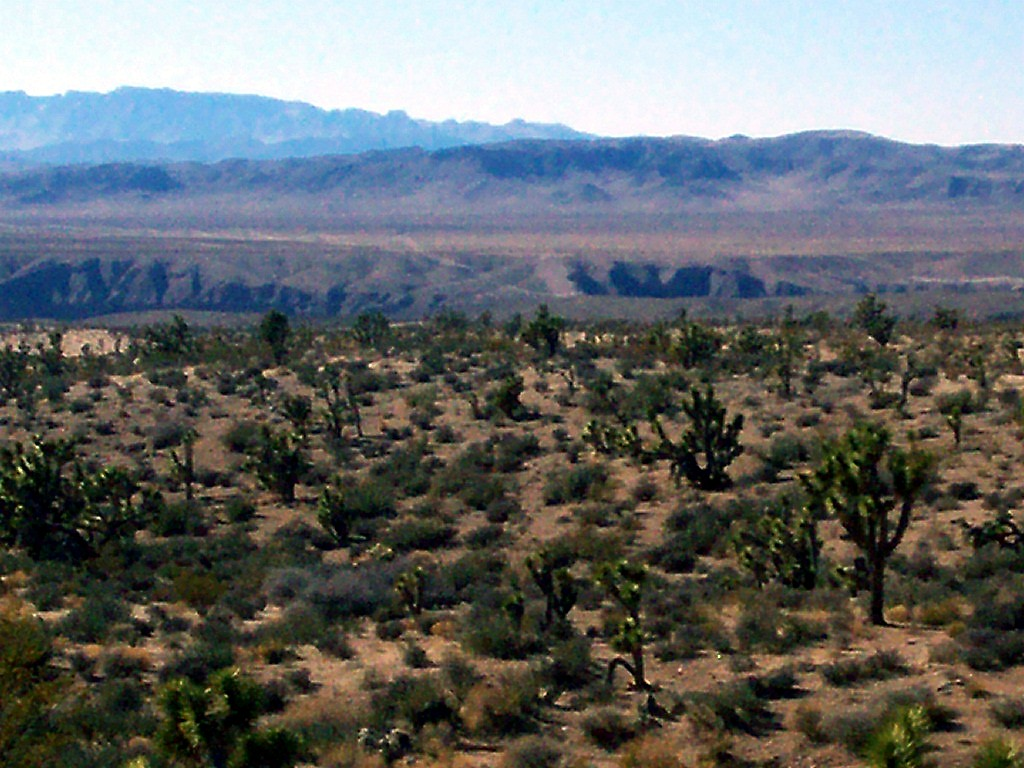
- Beaver Dam Wash National Conservation Area

- Location within the United States
- Location: Washington County, Utah, United States
- Nearest city: St. George, Utah
- Coordinates: 37.054°N 113.982°W
- Area: 63,500 acres (257 km^{2})
- Established: 2009
- Governing body: Bureau of Land Management
- Website: Official website

The Beaver Dam Wash National Conservation Area is a 63,500-acre (257 km^{2}) United States National Conservation Area located in southwest Utah west of St. George along the borders with Arizona and Nevada. It is managed by the U.S. Bureau of Land Management as part of the National Landscape Conservation System, and was authorized in the Omnibus Public Land Management Act of 2009.

The Beaver Dam Wash National Conservation Area (NCA) is drained by Beaver Dam Wash in the watershed of the Virgin River, a tributary of the Colorado River. The NCA provides habitat for the desert tortoise, bighorn sheep, Joshua trees, and other threatened and sensitive species.

== Gallery ==
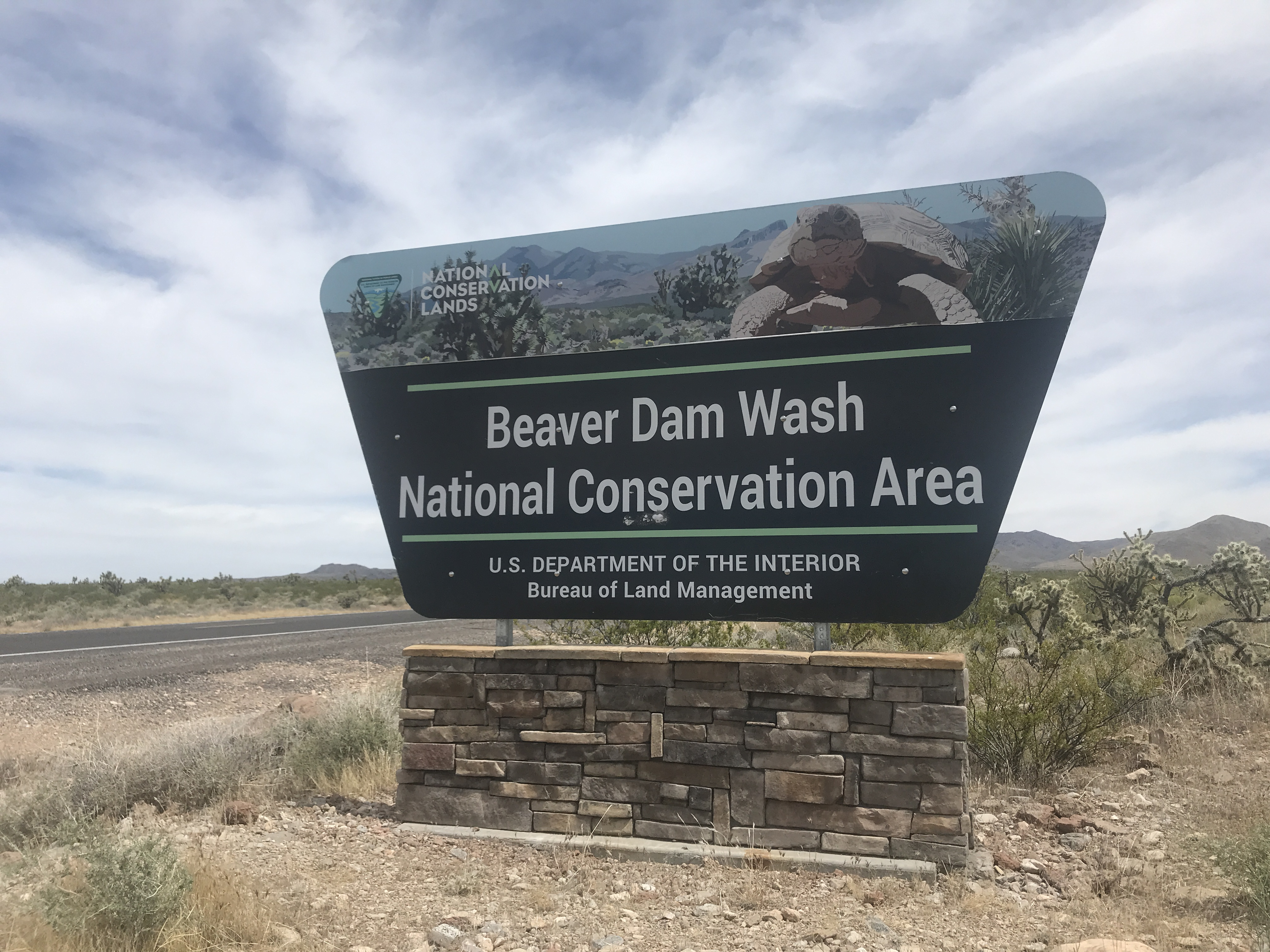
Beaver Dam Wash National Conservation Area Signboard

Driving in The Beaver Dam Wash National Conservation Area

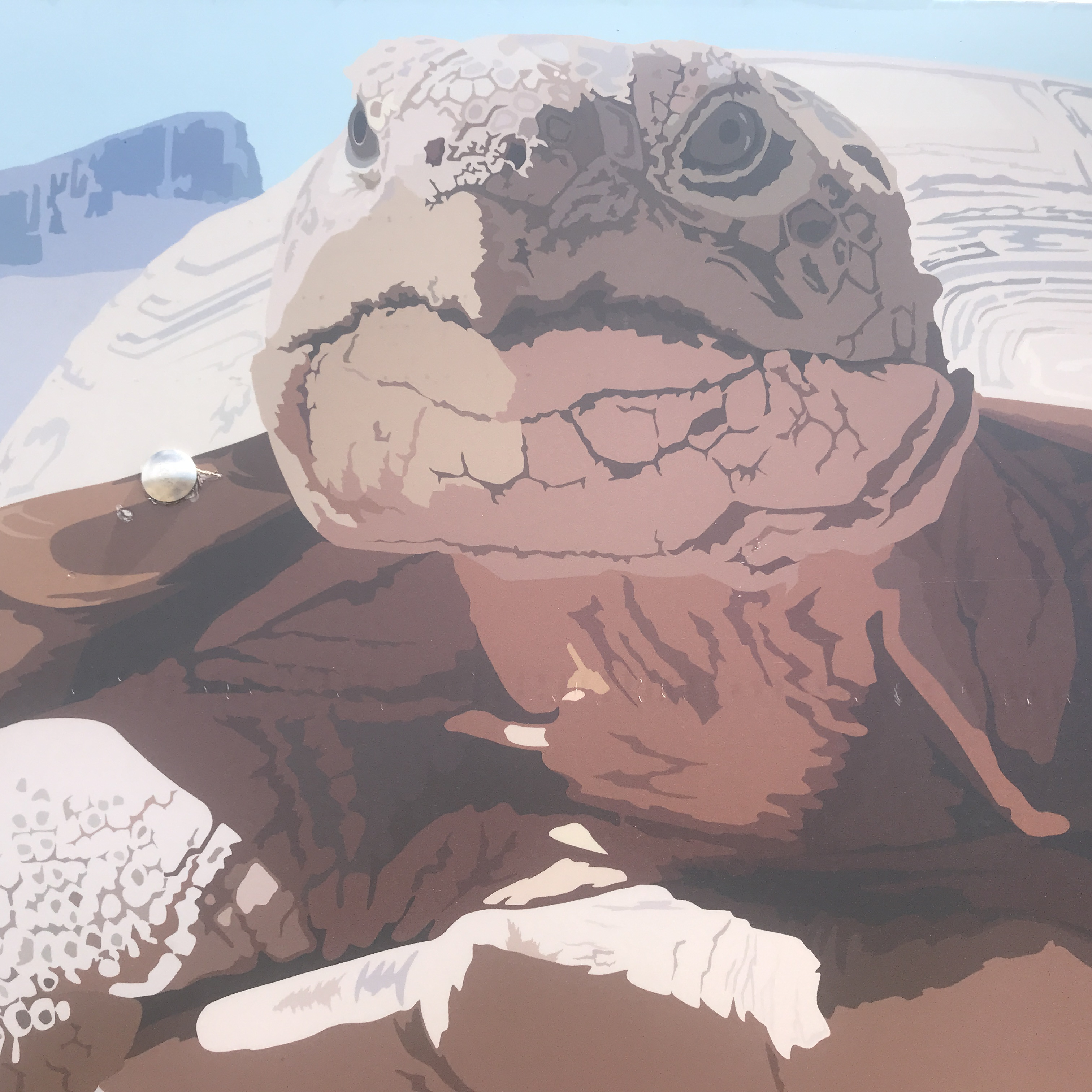
BLM Sign Detail

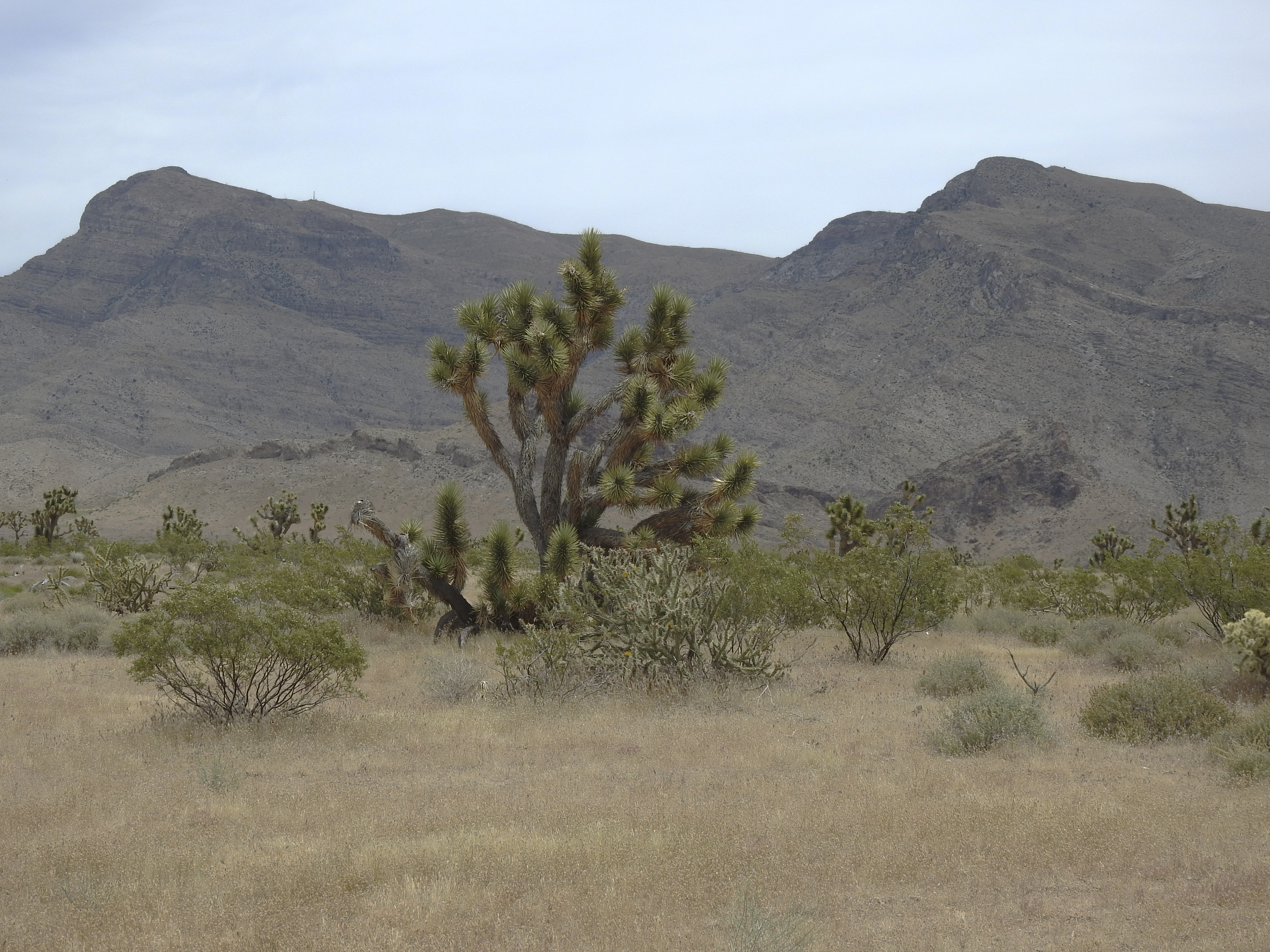
Representative landscape of the Beaver Dam Wash NCA

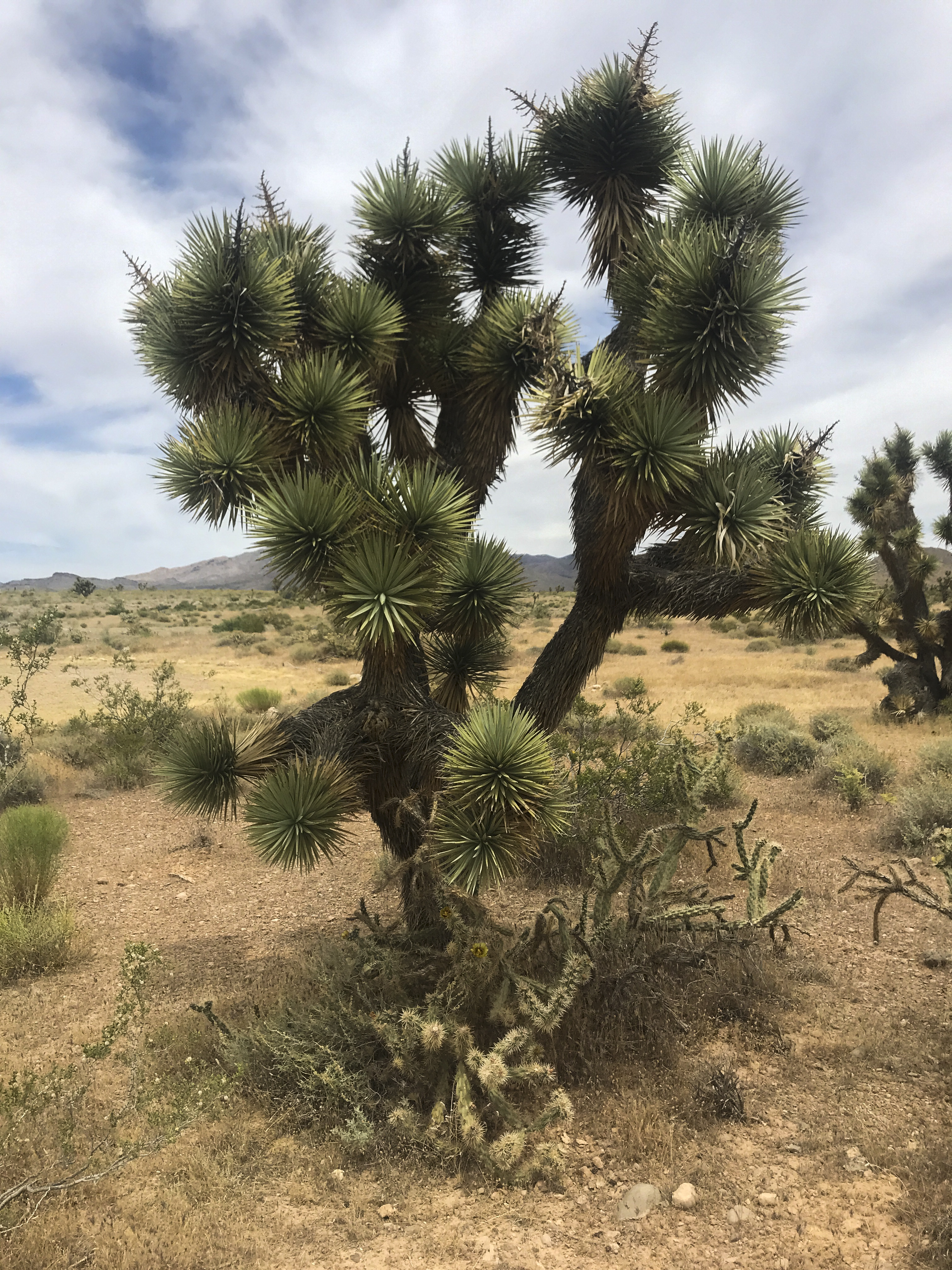
Eastern Joshua Tree (Yucca jaegeriana) at Beaver Dam Wash National Conservation Area

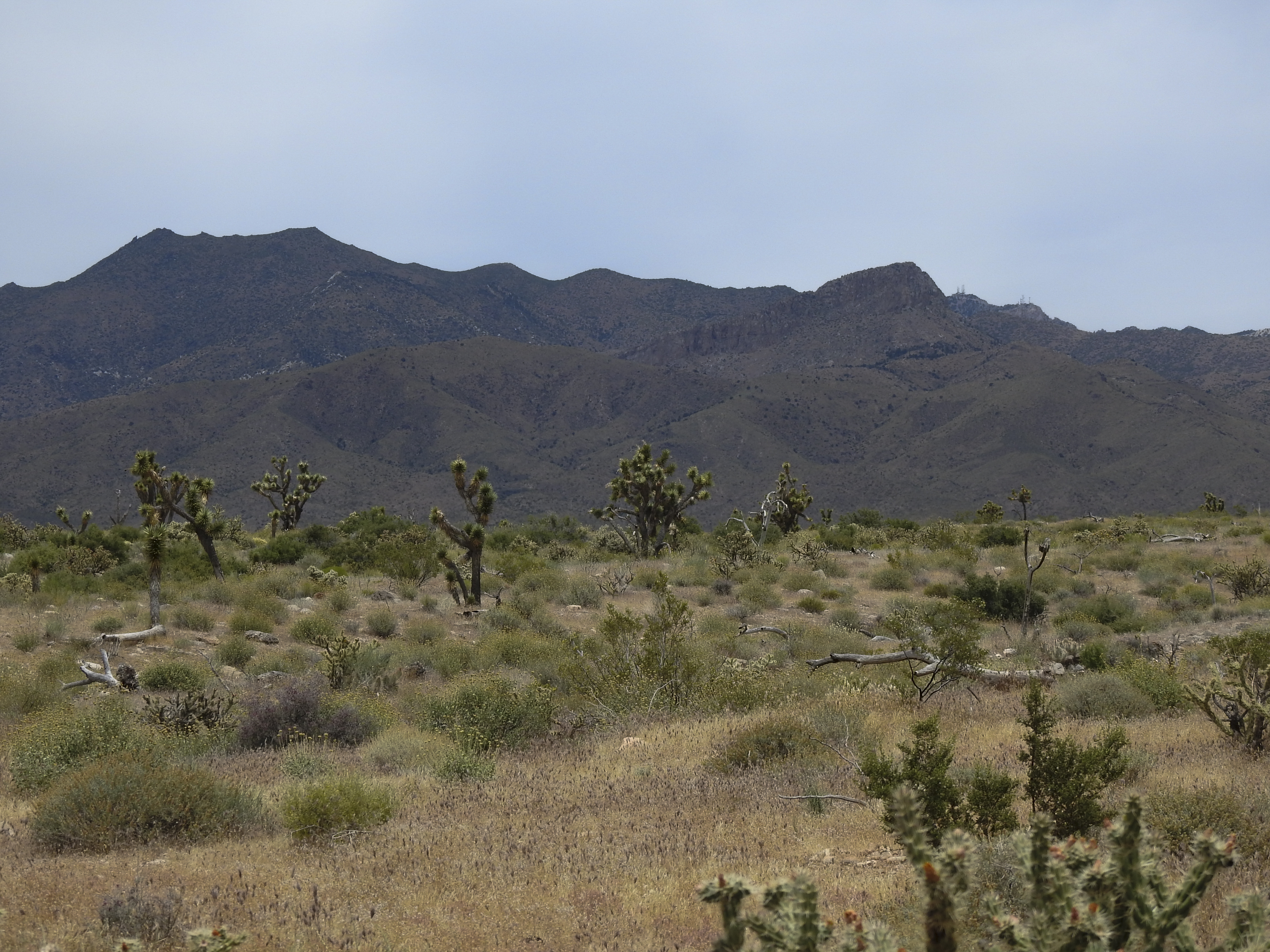
Representative landscape of the Joshua Tree National Natural Monument

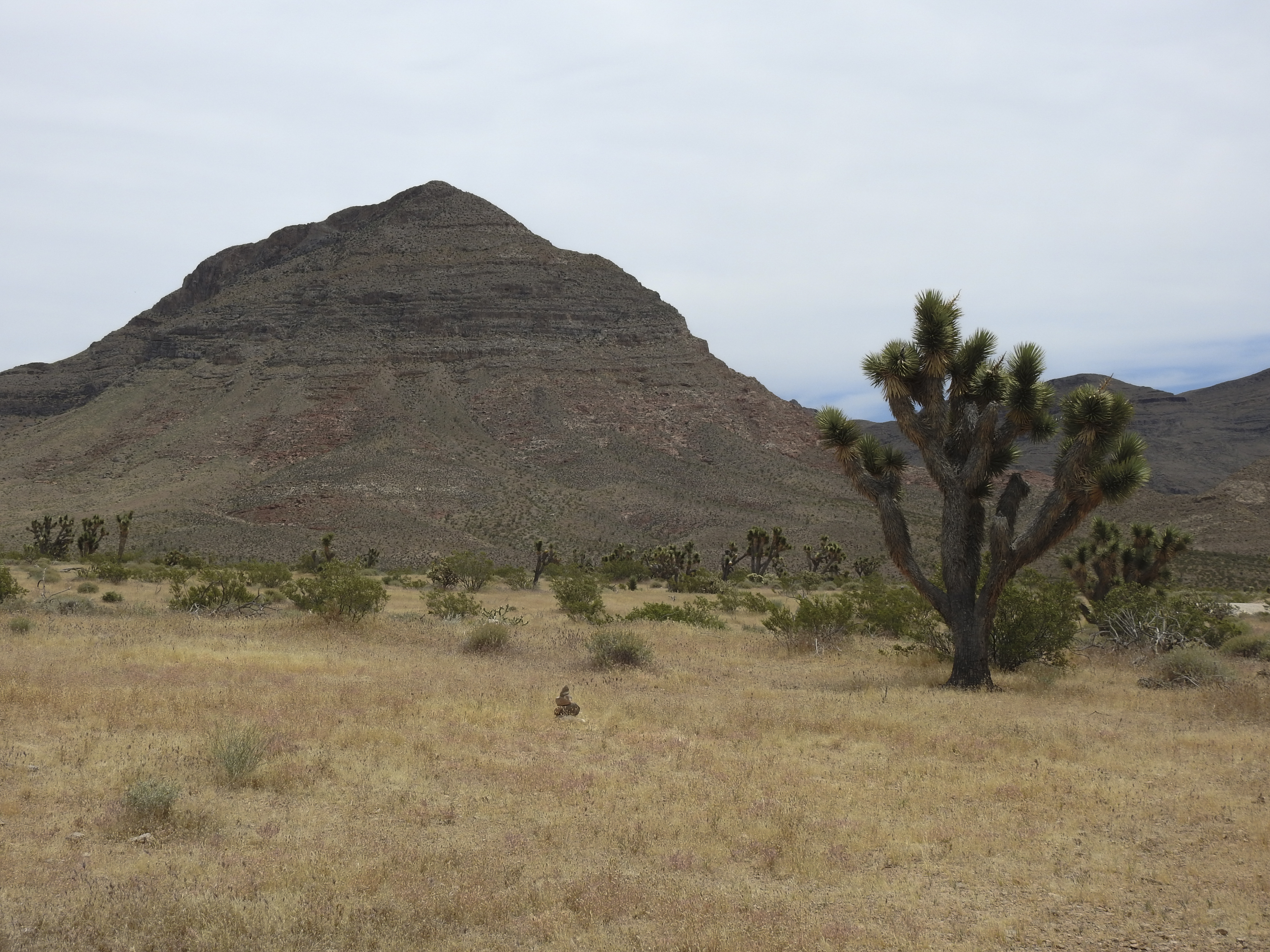
Typical Landscape at the Joshua National Natural Monument

Beaver Dam Wash National Conservation Area

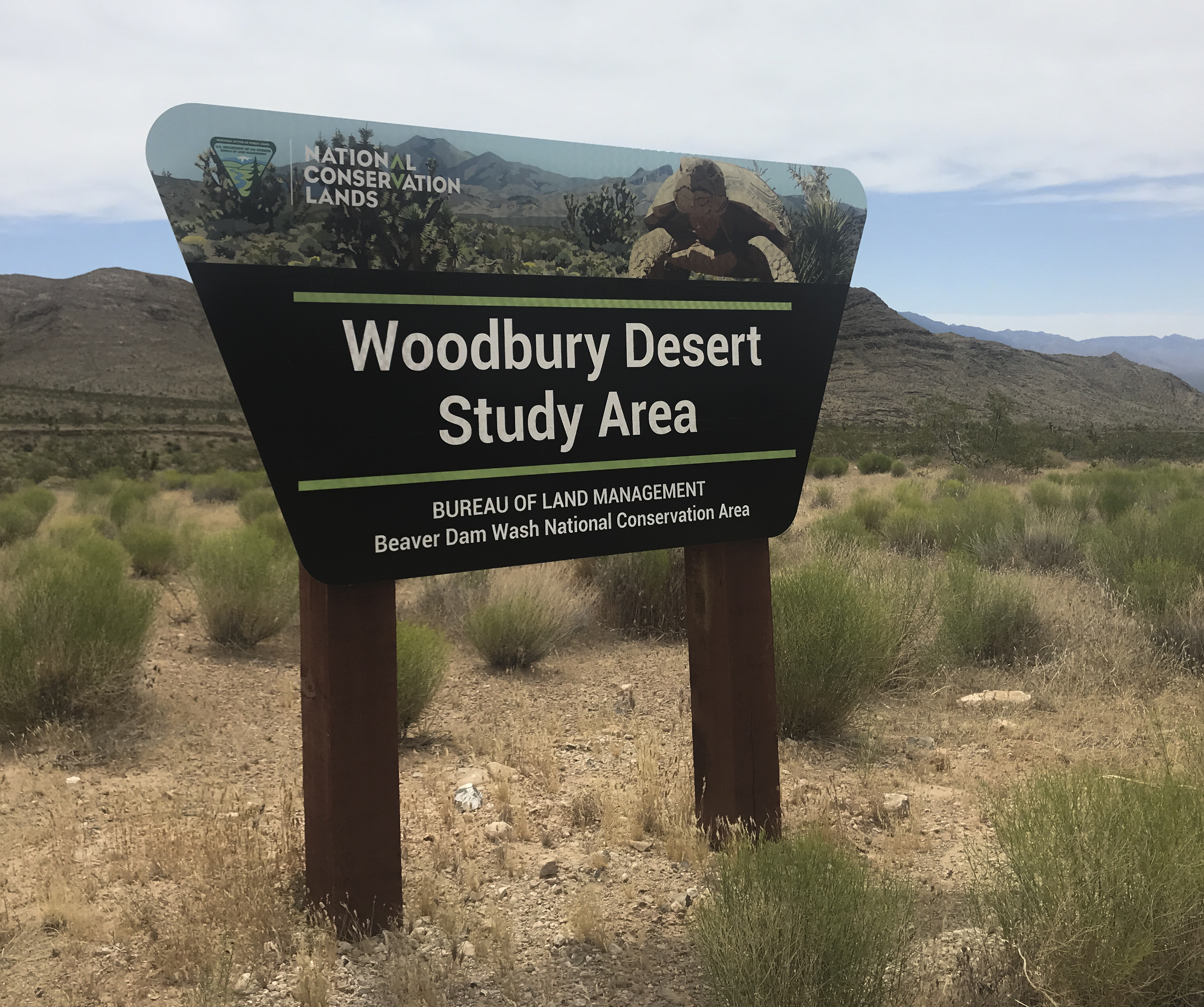
Woodbury desert study area sign

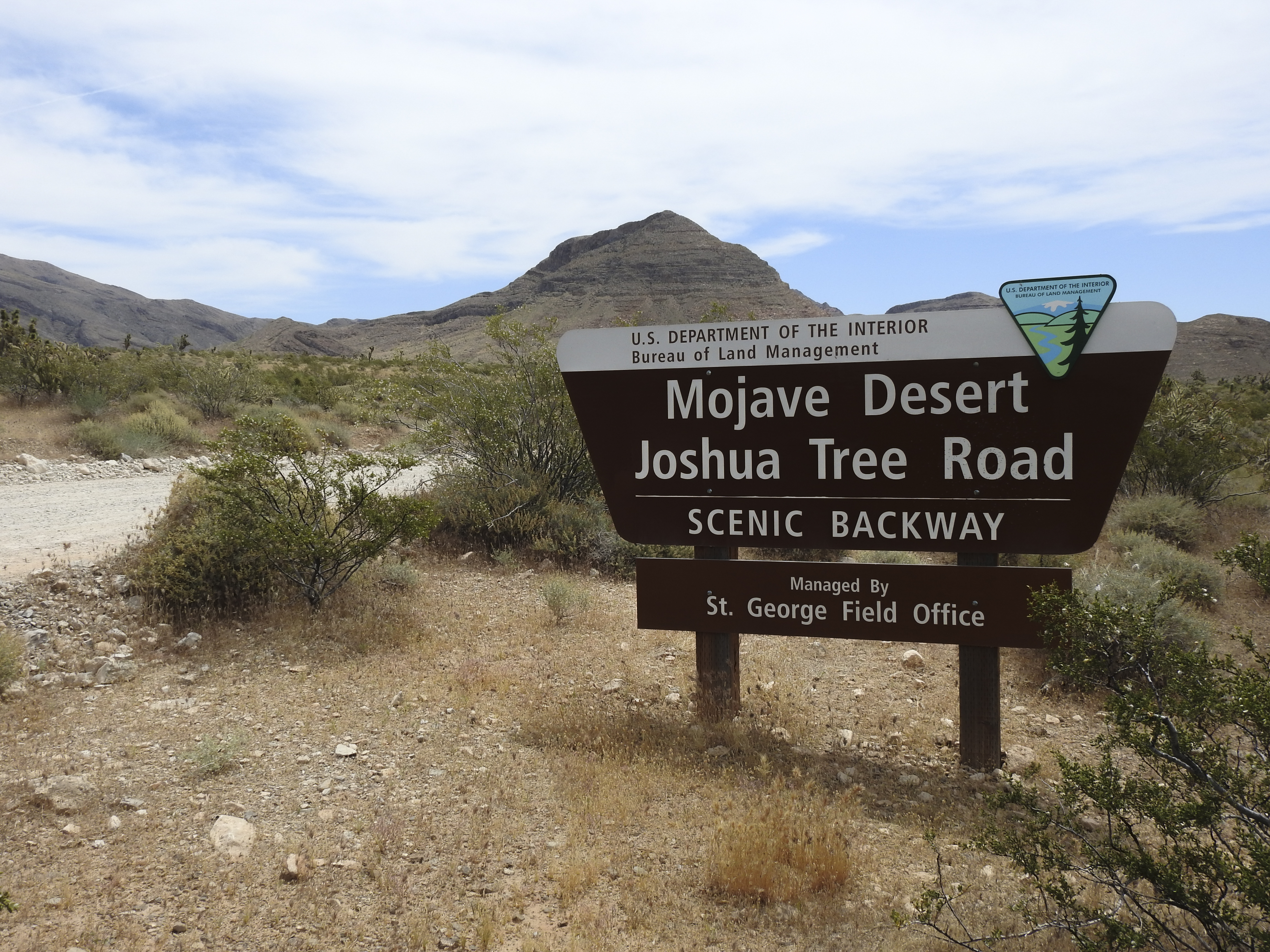
Mojave Desert Joshua Tree Road Sign
