= Woodbury (Leetown, West Virginia) =

Historic house in West Virginia, United States

- U.S. National Register of Historic Places
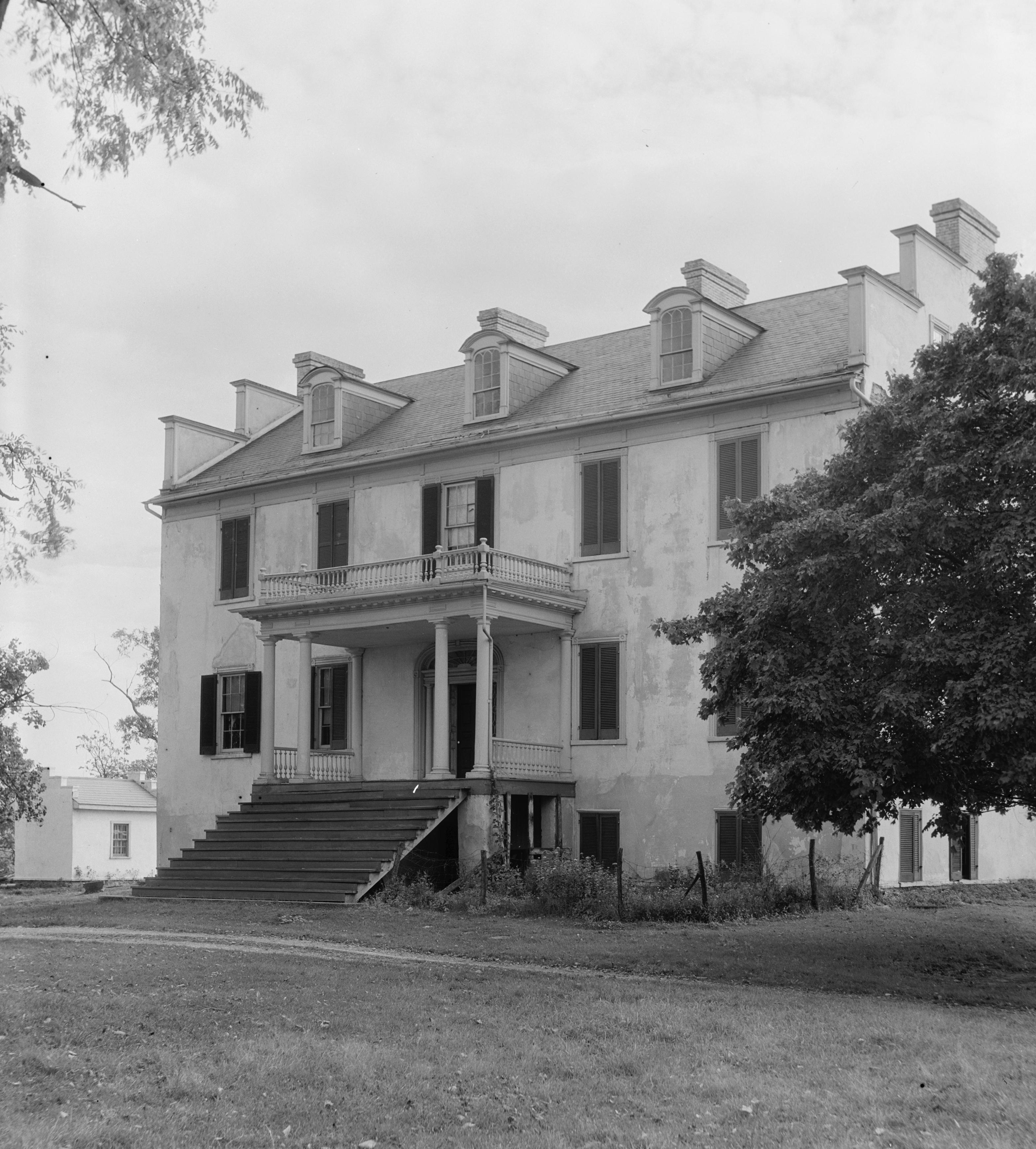
- Front of Woodbury

- Location within West Virginia Location within the United States
- Location: On County Road 1/4, near Leetown, West Virginia
- Coordinates: 39°21′28″N 77°54′29″W
- Area: 1.5 acres (0.61 ha)
- Built: 1834-1835
- Architectural style: Early Republic, Regency Style
- NRHP reference No.: 74002005
- Added to NRHP: October 9, 1974

Woodbury or Woodberry, is a historic mansion located near Leetown, Jefferson County, West Virginia. It was built in 1834-1835 for the jurist and Congressman Henry St. George Tucker, Sr. (1780–1848). Tucker lived at Woodbury from its construction until 1844.

== Description ==
Woodbury is 2 1/2 stories tall and is built of stone, faced with white plaster in a Regency period style. At 10,000 square feet (930 m^{2}) and 22 rooms, it is an unusually large house. The front facade features a flat-roofed center portico supported by four plain columns in front and two engaged columns in the rear. The five-bay elevation is raised above a particularly high raised basement. The end elevations have prominent stepped parapets incorporating the chimneys. The interior plan features a long transverse hall with a curved stairway at one end. A false window was provided at the right side of the first floor to deal with the stair crossing the window. The basement has a dining room, an unusual feature, and the attic was finished when built. A formal porch with paired columns is located on the entrance side, approached by a broad stairway. On the rear a porch extends across most of the width of the house, with stairs at each end.

It was listed on the National Register of Historic Places in 1974.
