= Dixon M. Woodbury =

American epilepsy researcher

Dixon Miles Woodbury (1921–1991) was an American epilepsy researcher and distinguished professor of Physiology and Pharmacology at the University of Utah School of Medicine. His research helped clarify the causes of seizure disorders and the mechanisms of anticonvulsant drugs. He published over 300 scientific articles and edited several books on epilepsy, including the first two volumes of Antiepileptic Drugs. His awards include the John Jacob Abel Award from the American Society for Pharmacology and Experimental Therapeutics (ASPET); the Epilepsy Research Award from the International League Against Epilepsy; Research Career Award from the National Institutes of Health; and William G. Lennox Award for outstanding research in epilepsy from the American Epilepsy Society.

Woodbury was born August 6, 1921, in St. George, Utah, to parents Angus and Grace Woodbury. His father was a zoologist at the University of Utah. Woodbury earned a B.A. in zoology (1942) and M.S. in herpetology (1945) from the University of Utah, publishing papers on snakes with his father and a thesis on metabolic studies of small snakes. He then attended the University of California, Berkeley, where he received a PhD in Physiochemical Biology and Cellular Physiology in 1948. He returned to the University of Utah in 1948, becoming professor of Pharmacology in the School of Medicine in 1961. From 1972 to 1980 he was chairman of the Department of Pharmacology, and from 1980 until his death was Division Head of Neuropharmacology and Epileptology in the School of Medicine. He died in a Bountiful, Utah, hospital on July 29, 1991, aged 69. Woodbury was also a high priest in the Church of Jesus Christ of Latter-day Saints, serving at the time of his death as clerk in the stake of Val Verda, Utah.
