= National Conservation Lands =

Federally-managed protected areas in the United States

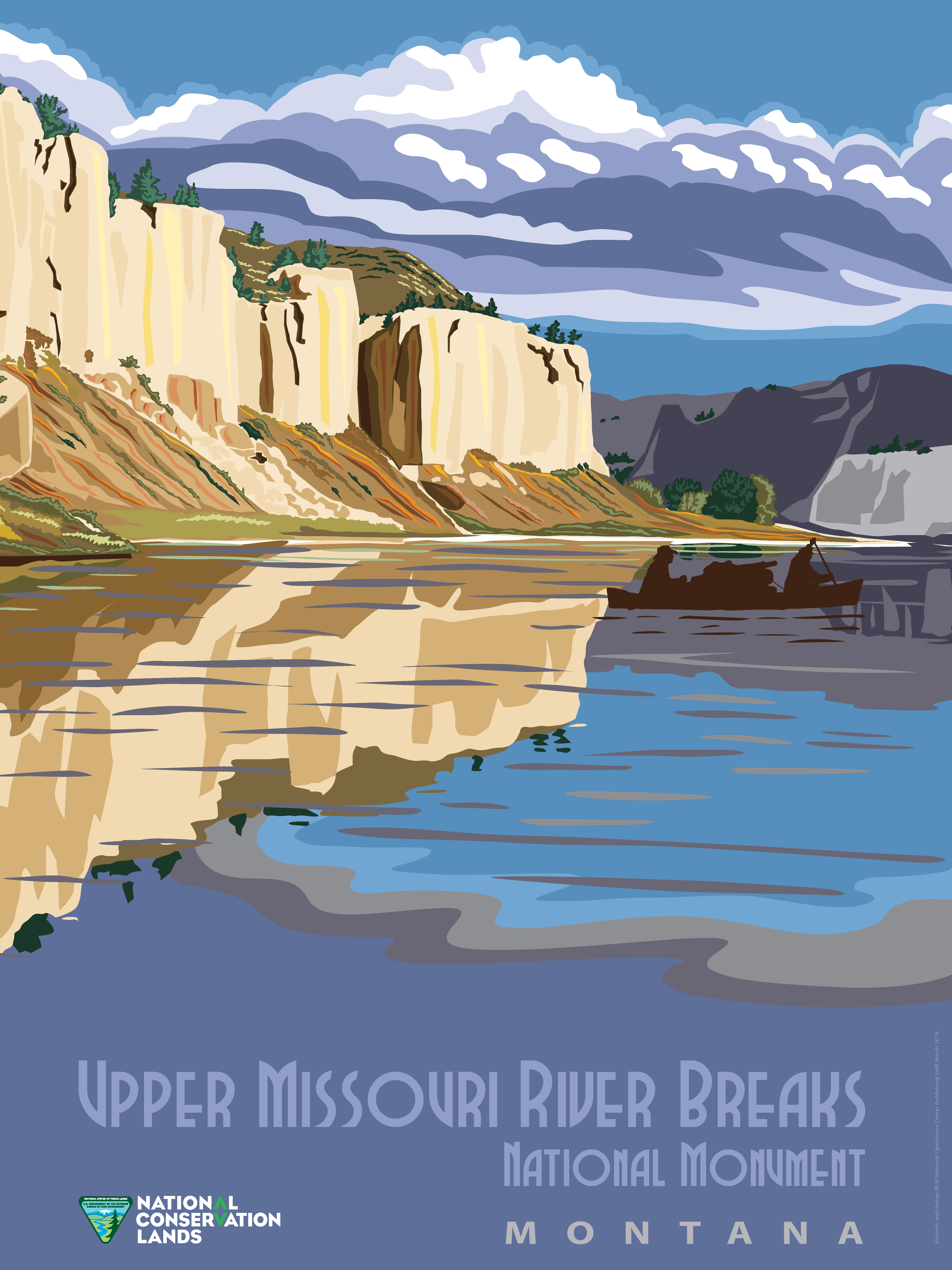
National Conservation Lands poster for Upper Missouri River Breaks National Monument (2014)

National Conservation Lands, formally known as the National Landscape Conservation System, is a 39.5-million-acre (160,000 km^{2}) collection of lands in 904 federally recognized areas considered to be the crown jewels of the American West. These lands represent 15% of the 258 million acres (1,040,000 km^{2}) managed by the Bureau of Land Management (BLM). The BLM is the largest federal public land manager and is responsible for over 40% of all the federal public land in the nation. The other major federal public land managers include the US Forest Service (USFS), National Park Service (NPS), and the US Fish and Wildlife Service (USFWS).

Over the years, the Bureau of Land Management has had to adjust its approach to public land management to fit the changing needs of the nation. The BLM historically has managed lands under its jurisdiction for extractive uses, such as mining, logging, grazing, and oil and gas production. In 1983, Congress acknowledged the value of watersheds, wildlife habitat, recreation, scenery, scientific exploration and other non-extractive uses with the designation of the first BLM-managed wilderness area—the Bear Trap Canyon unit of the Lee Metcalf Wilderness in Montana. In 1996, President Clinton underscored non-extractive priorities on BLM lands when he established the first national monument to be administered by the BLM—the Grand Staircase-Escalante National Monument in southern Utah. With this and several similar designations, a new focus emerged that would become part of how the agency looks at the land it manages: the protection of special areas where conservation and restoration of the landscape and its biological or cultural resources is the overriding objective.

The Bureau of Land Management's National Landscape Conservation System, better known as the National Conservation Lands, was created in 2000 with the mission to "conserve, protect, and restore these nationally significant landscapes that have outstanding cultural, ecological, and scientific values for the benefit of current and future generations."

There are eleven federal conservation designations for the units that make up the National Conservation Lands:

- National Monument
- National Conservation Area
- Wilderness Area
- Wilderness Study Area
- National Wild and Scenic River
- National Scenic Trail
- National Historic Trail
- Cooperative Management and Protection Area
- Forest Reserve
- Outstanding Natural Area
- National Scenic Area

When the Conservation System was created in 2000 without Congressional authorization, there was no guarantee that the System would be permanent. The National Landscape Conservation System Act was signed into law in March 2009 as part of the Omnibus Public Land Management Act of 2009. The Act permanently unified the individual units as a public lands System, protecting the System in law so that it would no longer exist at the pleasure of each president. This marked the first new congressionally authorized public lands system in decades.

The act also added 1,200,000 acres (490,000 ha) of new designations to the System, including a National Monument, three National Conservation Areas, Wilderness, Wild and Scenic Rivers and National Scenic Trails.

== List of National Conservation Lands areas ==
=== National monuments ===
As of January 2026, there are 31 sites totaling 13,064,883 acres (5,287,171 ha).

Monument	State	Established	BLM/federal area	Non-federal area	Total area
Agua Fria	Arizona	2000	70,980 acres (28,720 ha)	1,364 acres (552 ha)	72,344 acres (29,277 ha)
Avi Kwa Ame	Nevada	2023	506,814 acres (205,100 ha) (Note: 442,832 acres are managed by the BLM, while the remaining 63,901 acres are managed by the NPS.)	0 acres (0 ha)	506,814 acres (205,100 ha)
Baaj Nwaavjo I'tah Kukveni – Ancestral Footprints of Grand Canyon	Arizona	2023	917,618 acres (371,347 ha) (Note: 529,242 acres are managed by the BLM, while the remaining 388,376 acres are managed by the USFS.)	42,409 acres (17,162 ha)	960,027 acres (388,509 ha)
Basin and Range	Nevada	2015	703,585 acres (284,731 ha)	4,438 acres (1,796 ha)	708,023 acres (286,527 ha)
Bears Ears	Utah	2016	1,363,948 acres (551,970 ha) (Note: 1,074,908 acres are managed by the BLM, while the remaining 289,040 acres are managed by the USFS.)	26,911 acres (10,890 ha)	1,390,859 acres (562,861 ha)
Berryessa Snow Mountain	California	2015	344,476 acres (139,404 ha) (Note: 147,262 acres are managed by the BLM, while the remaining 197,214 acres are managed by the USFS.)	0 acres (0 ha)	344,476 acres (139,404 ha)
Browns Canyon	Colorado	2015	21,604 acres (8,743 ha) (Note: 9,793 acres are managed by the BLM, while the remaining 11,811 acres are managed by the USFS.)	0 acres (0 ha)	21,604 acres (8,743 ha)
California Coastal	California	2000	8,858 acres (3,585 ha) (Note: This number includes the Piedras Blancas Light Station Outstanding Natural Area.)	0 acres (0 ha)	8,858 acres (3,585 ha)
Canyons of the Ancients	Colorado	2000	176,370 acres (71,370 ha)	8,630 acres (3,490 ha)	185,000 acres (75,000 ha)
Carrizo Plain	California	2001	211,045 acres (85,407 ha)	35,772 acres (14,476 ha)	246,817 acres (99,883 ha)
Cascade–Siskiyou	Oregon	2000	112,928 acres (45,700 ha)	19,752 acres (7,993 ha)	132,680 acres (53,690 ha)
Chuckwalla	California	2025	624,270 acres (252,630 ha)	114,923 acres (46,508 ha)	739,193 acres (299,141 ha)
Craters of the Moon	Idaho	2000	738,420 acres (298,830 ha) (Note: 275,076 acres are managed by the BLM, while the remaining 463,344 acres are managed by the NPS.)	14,824 acres (5,999 ha)	753,244 acres (304,827 ha)
Fort Ord	California	2012	14,658 acres (5,932 ha)	0 acres (0 ha)	14,658 acres (5,932 ha)
Gold Butte	Nevada	2016	296,937 acres (120,166 ha)	0 acres (0 ha)	296,937 acres (120,166 ha)
Grand Canyon-Parashant	Arizona	2000	1,021,030 acres (413,200 ha) (Note: 812,581 acres are managed by the BLM, while the remaining 208,449 acres are managed by the NPS.)	27,291 acres (11,044 ha)	1,048,321 acres (424,240 ha)
Grand Staircase–Escalante	Utah	1996	1,870,000 acres (760,000 ha)	2,478 acres (1,003 ha)	1,872,478 acres (757,765 ha)
Ironwood Forest	Arizona	2000	129,055 acres (52,227 ha)	59,573 acres (24,108 ha)	188,628 acres (76,335 ha)
Jurassic	Utah	2019	850 acres (340 ha)	0 acres (0 ha)	850 acres (340 ha)
Kasha-Katuwe Tent Rocks	New Mexico	2001	4,647 acres (1,881 ha)	757 acres (306 ha)	5,404 acres (2,187 ha)
Mojave Trails	California	2016	1,600,000 acres (650,000 ha)	0 acres (0 ha)	1,600,000 acres (650,000 ha)
Organ Mountains–Desert Peaks	New Mexico	2014	496,529 acres (200,938 ha)	77,008 acres (31,164 ha)	573,527 acres (232,098 ha)
Pompeys Pillar	Montana	2001	51 acres (21 ha)	0 acres (0 ha)	51 acres (21 ha)
Prehistoric Trackways	New Mexico	2009	5,280 acres (2,140 ha)	0 acres (0 ha)	5,280 acres (2,140 ha)
Rio Grande del Norte	New Mexico	2013	242,710 acres (98,220 ha)	68,020 acres (27,530 ha)	310,730 acres (125,750 ha)
San Juan Islands	Washington	2013	970 acres (390 ha)	0 acres (0 ha)	970 acres (390 ha)
Sand To Snow	California	2016	154,000 acres (62,000 ha) (Note: 83,000 acres are managed by the BLM, while the remaining 71,000 acres are managed by the USFS.)	0 acres (0 ha)	154,000 acres (62,000 ha)
Santa Rosa and San Jacinto Mountains	California	2000, 2009	169,096 acres (68,431 ha) (Note: 98,981 acres are managed by the BLM, while the remaining 70,115 acres are managed by USFS.)	110,926 acres (44,890 ha)	280,071 acres (113,341 ha)
Sonoran Desert	Arizona	2001	486,400 acres (196,800 ha)	10,000 acres (4,000 ha)	496,400 acres (200,900 ha)
Upper Missouri River Breaks	Montana	2001	377,346 acres (152,707 ha)	120,475 acres (48,755 ha)	497,821 acres (201,461 ha)
Vermilion Cliffs	Arizona	2000	279,566 acres (113,136 ha)	14,121 acres (5,715 ha)	293,687 acres (118,851 ha)

=== National conservation areas (NCAs) ===
As of January 2026, there are 19 sites totaling 3,870,485 acres (1,566,330 ha).

Conservation Area	State	Established	Federal area	Non-federal area	Total area
Beaver Dam Wash	Utah	2009	63,478 acres (25,689 ha)	18,619 acres (7,535 ha)	82,097 acres (33,223 ha)
Black Rock Desert–High Rock Canyon Emigrant Trails	Nevada	2000	799,485 acres (323,540 ha)	17,456 acres (7,064 ha)	816,941 acres (330,604 ha)
Dominguez–Escalante	Colorado	2009	210,149 acres (85,044 ha)	8,245 acres (3,337 ha)	218,394 acres (88,381 ha)
El Malpais	New Mexico	1987	227,100 acres (91,900 ha)	35,000 acres (14,000 ha)	262,100 acres (106,100 ha)
Fort Stanton–Snowy River Cave	New Mexico	2009	24,876 acres (10,067 ha)	0 acres (0 ha)	24,876 acres (10,067 ha)
Gila Box Riparian	Arizona	1990	21,767 acres (8,809 ha)	1,720 acres (700 ha)	23,487 acres (9,505 ha)
Gunnison Gorge	Colorado	1999	63,201 acres (25,577 ha)	1,823 acres (738 ha)	65,024 acres (26,314 ha)
John Wesley Powell	Utah	2019	29,868 acres (12,087 ha)	0 acres (0 ha)	29,868 acres (12,087 ha)
King Range	California	1970	62,562 acres (25,318 ha)	3,617 acres (1,464 ha)	66,179 acres (26,782 ha)
Las Cienegas	Arizona	2000	41,972 acres (16,985 ha)	5,307 acres (2,148 ha)	47,279 acres (19,133 ha)
McInnis Canyons	Colorado	2000	123,460 acres (49,960 ha)	814 acres (329 ha)	124,274 acres (50,292 ha)
Numanaa Nobe	Nevada	2022	160,223 acres (64,840 ha)	0 acres (0 ha)	160,223 acres (64,840 ha)
Pistone Black Mouintains	Nevada	2022	3,415 acres (1,382 ha)	0 acres (0 ha)	3,415 acres (1,382 ha)
Red Cliffs	Utah	2009	44,859 acres (18,154 ha)	16,366 acres (6,623 ha)	61,225 acres (24,777 ha)
Red Rock Canyon	Nevada	1990	196,877 acres (79,673 ha)	0 acres (0 ha)	196,877 acres (79,673 ha)
San Pedro Riparian	Arizona	1988	56,431 acres (22,837 ha)	0 acres (0 ha)	56,431 acres (22,837 ha)
Sloan Canyon	Nevada	2002	48,438 acres (19,602 ha)	0 acres (0 ha)	48,438 acres (19,602 ha)
Morley Nelson Snake River Birds of Prey	Idaho	1993	483,700 acres (195,700 ha)	46,000 acres (19,000 ha)	529,700 acres (214,400 ha)
Steese	Alaska	1980	1,208,624 acres (489,113 ha)	0 acres (0 ha)	1,208,624 acres (489,113 ha)

=== BLM wilderness areas ===
As of January 2026, there are 263 sites totaling 10,185,931 acres (4,122,100 ha). This number excludes wilderness associated with other agencies.

Wilderness area	State	Established	BLM area
Aden Lava Flow	New Mexico	2019	27,673 acres (11,199 ha)
Agua Tibia	California	2009	538 acres (218 ha)
Ah-Shi-Sle-Pah	New Mexico	2019	7,242 acres (2,931 ha)
Aravaipa Canyon	Arizona	1984	19,700 acres (8,000 ha)
Argus Range	California	1994	65,726 acres (26,598 ha)
Arrastra Mountain	Arizona	1990	129,800 acres (52,500 ha)
Arrow Canyon	Nevada	2002	27,530 acres (11,140 ha)
Aubrey Peak	Arizona	1990	15,440 acres (6,250 ha)
Avawatz Mountains	California	2019	89,500 acres (36,200 ha)
Baboquivari Peak	Arizona	1990	2,040 acres (830 ha)
Bear Trap Canyon	Utah	2009	40 acres (16 ha)
Beauty Mountain	California	2009	15,628 acres (6,324 ha)
Beaver Dam Mountains	Arizona, Utah	1984	18,667 acres (7,554 ha)
Becky Peak	Nevada	2006	18,119 acres (7,332 ha)
Big Horn Mountains	Arizona	1990	21,000 acres (8,500 ha)
Big Maria Mountains	California	1994	45,384 acres (18,366 ha)
Big Rocks	Nevada	2004	12,930 acres (5,230 ha)
Bigelow Cholla Garden	California	1994	14,645 acres (5,927 ha)
Big Jacks Creek	Idaho	2009	52,926 acres (21,418 ha)
Bighorn Mountain	California	1994	26,543 acres (10,742 ha)
Big Wild Horse Mesa	Utah	2019	18,192 acres (7,362 ha)
Bisti/De-Na-Zin	New Mexico	1984, 1996, 2019	43,420 acres (17,570 ha)
Black Mountain	California	1994	20,548 acres (8,315 ha)
Blackridge	Utah	2009	13,107 acres (5,304 ha)
Black Ridge Canyons	Colorado, Utah	2000	75,418 acres (30,521 ha)
Black Rock Desert	Nevada	2000	314,835 acres (127,409 ha)
Bright Star	California	1994	8,191 acres (3,315 ha)
Bristlecone	Nevada	2006	14,095 acres (5,704 ha)
Bristol Mountains	California	1994	71,389 acres (28,890 ha)
Broad Canyon	New Mexico	2019	13,902 acres (5,626 ha)
Bruneau–Jarbridge	Idaho	2009	89,996 acres (36,420 ha)
Buzzards Peak	California	2019	11,840 acres (4,790 ha)
Cache Creek	California	2006	27,296 acres (11,046 ha)
Cadiz Dunes	California	1994	19,935 acres (8,067 ha)
Cain Mountain	Nevada	2022	14,050 acres (5,690 ha)
Calico Mountains	Nevada	2000	64,968 acres (26,292 ha)
Canaan Mountain	Utah	2009	44,447 acres (17,987 ha)
Carrizo Gorge	California	1994	14,740 acres (5,970 ha)
Cebolla	New Mexico	1987	61,600 acres (24,900 ha)
Cedar Mountain	Utah	2006	99,428 acres (40,237 ha)
Cedar Roughs	California	2006	6,287 acres (2,544 ha)
Cerro del Yuta	New Mexico	2019	13,420 acres (5,430 ha)
Chemehuevi Mountains	California	1994	85,864 acres (34,748 ha)
Chimney Peak	California	1994	13,140 acres (5,320 ha)
Chuckwalla Mountains	California	1994, 2009	99,548 acres (40,286 ha)
Cinder Cone	New Mexico	2019	16,935 acres (6,853 ha)
Clan Alpine Mountains	Nevada	2022	128,362 acres (51,946 ha)
Cleghorn Lakes	California	1994	39,167 acres (15,850 ha)
Clipper Mountain	California	1994	33,843 acres (13,696 ha)
Clover Mountains	Nevada	2004	85,668 acres (34,669 ha)
Cold Wash	Utah	2019	11,001 acres (4,452 ha)
Coso Range	California	1994	49,296 acres (19,949 ha)
Cottonwood Canyon	Utah	2009	11,667 acres (4,721 ha)
Cottonwood Point	Arizona	1984	6,860 acres (2,780 ha)
Cougar Canyon	Utah	2009	10,648 acres (4,309 ha)
Coyote Mountains	Arizona	1990	5,100 acres (2,100 ha)
Coyote Mountains	California	1994	18,631 acres (7,540 ha)
Darwin Falls	California	1994	8,189 acres (3,314 ha)
Dead Mountains	California	1994	47,158 acres (19,084 ha)
Deep Creek	Utah	2009	3,291 acres (1,332 ha)
Deep Creek North	Utah	2009	4,478 acres (1,812 ha)
Delamar Mountains	Nevada	2004	111,066 acres (44,947 ha)
Desatoya Mountains	Nevada	2022	40,303 acres (16,310 ha)
Desolation Canyon	Utah	2019	142,996 acres (57,868 ha)
Devil's Canyon	Utah	2019	8,675 acres (3,511 ha)
Devil's Staircase	Oregon	2019	30,621 acres (12,392 ha)
Doc's Pass	Utah	2009	18,216 acres (7,372 ha)
Domeland	California	1994	39,379 acres (15,936 ha)
Dominguez Canyon	Colorado	2009	66,280 acres (26,820 ha)
Dos Cabezas Mountains	Arizona	1990	11,700 acres (4,700 ha)
Eagle Canyon	Utah	2019	13,832 acres (5,598 ha)
Eagletail Mountains	Arizona	1990	97,880 acres (39,610 ha)
East Cactus Plain	Arizona	1990	14,630 acres (5,920 ha)
East Fork High Rock Canyon	Nevada	2000	53,618 acres (21,698 ha)
East Potrillo Mountains	New Mexico	2019	12,155 acres (4,919 ha)
El Dorado	Nevada	2002	5,700 acres (2,300 ha)
Elkhorn Ridge	California	2006, 2011	11,001 acres (4,452 ha)
El Paso Mountains	California	1994	23,679 acres (9,583 ha)
Far South Egans	Nevada	2004	36,299 acres (14,690 ha)
Fish Creek Mountains	California	1994	21,390 acres (8,660 ha)
Fishhooks	Arizona	1990	10,500 acres (4,200 ha)
Fortification Range	Nevada	2004	30,539 acres (12,359 ha)
Frank Church–River of No Return	Idaho	1980, 1984	802 acres (325 ha) (BLM only)
Funeral Mountains	California	1994	25,707 acres (10,403 ha)
Gibraltar Mountain	Arizona	1990	18,790 acres (7,600 ha)
Golden Valley	California	1994, 2019	37,786 acres (15,291 ha)
Goose Creek	Utah	2009	93 acres (38 ha)
Goshute Canyon	Nevada	2006	42,544 acres (17,217 ha)
Government Peak	Nevada	2006	6,313 acres (2,555 ha)
Grand Wash Cliffs	Arizona	1984	37,030 acres (14,990 ha)
Granite Mountain	California	2009	31,059 acres (12,569 ha)
Grass Valley	California	1994	30,186 acres (12,216 ha)
Great Falls Basin	California	2019	7,810 acres (3,160 ha)
Gunnison Gorge	Colorado	1999	17,784 acres (7,197 ha)
Harcuvar Mountains	Arizona	1990	25,050 acres (10,140 ha)
Harquahala Mountains	Arizona	1990	22,880 acres (9,260 ha)
Hassayampa River Canyon	Arizona	1990	12,300 acres (5,000 ha)
Hells Canyon	Arizona	1990	9,951 acres (4,027 ha)
Hells Canyon	Oregon	1984	946 acres (383 ha) (BLM only)
Highland Ridge	Nevada	2006	68,623 acres (27,771 ha)
High Rock Canyon	Nevada	2000	46,465 acres (18,804 ha)
High Rock Lake	Nevada	2000	59,107 acres (23,920 ha)
Hollow Hills	California	1994	22,366 acres (9,051 ha)
Horse Valley	Utah	2019	12,201 acres (4,938 ha)
Hummingbird Springs	Arizona	1990	31,200 acres (12,600 ha)
Ibex	California	1994	28,822 acres (11,664 ha)
Indian Pass	California	1994, 2019	43,279 acres (17,514 ha)
Inyo Mountains	California	1994	125,075 acres (50,616 ha)
Ireteba Peaks	Nevada	2002	10,446 acres (4,227 ha)
Ishi	California	1984	199 acres (81 ha)
Jacumba	California	1994	31,358 acres (12,690 ha)
Jim McClure-Jerry Peak	Idaho	2015	23,916 acres (9,678 ha)
Jumbo Springs	Nevada	2002	4,631 acres (1,874 ha)
Juniper Dunes	Washington	1984	7,140 acres (2,890 ha)
Kanab Creek	Arizona	1984	6,700 acres (2,700 ha)
Kelso Dunes	California	1994	144,915 acres (58,645 ha)
Kiavah	California	1994	41,000 acres (17,000 ha)
Kingston Range	California	1994, 2019	252,149 acres (102,041 ha)
King Range	California	2006	42,695 acres (17,278 ha)
Labyrinth Canyon	Utah	2019	54,643 acres (22,113 ha)
La Madre Mountain	Nevada	2002	27,867 acres (11,277 ha)
La Verkin Creek	Utah	2009	453 acres (183 ha)
Lee Metcalf	Montana	1983	6,347 acres (2,569 ha)
Lime Canyon	Nevada	2002	23,234 acres (9,402 ha)
Little Chuckwalla Mountains	California	1994	28,052 acres (11,352 ha)
Little High Rock Canyon	Nevada	2000	48,355 acres (19,569 ha)
Little Jacks Creen	Idaho	2009	50,929 acres (20,610 ha)
Little Ocean Draw	Utah	2019	20,660 acres (8,360 ha)
Little Picacho	California	1994	38,216 acres (15,465 ha)
Little Wild Horse Canyon	Utah	2019	5,479 acres (2,217 ha)
Lower Last Chance	Utah	2019	19,339 acres (7,826 ha)
Lower White River	Oregon	2009	1,063 acres (430 ha)
Machesna Mountain	California	1984	123 acres (50 ha)
Malpais Mesa	California	1994	31,906 acres (12,912 ha)
Manly Peak	California	1994	12,897 acres (5,219 ha)
Meadow Valley Range	Nevada	2004	123,508 acres (49,982 ha)
Mecca Hills	California	1994	26,356 acres (10,666 ha)
Mesquite	California	1994	44,804 acres (18,132 ha)
Mexican Mountain	Utah	2019	76,413 acres (30,923 ha)
Milpitas Wash	California	2019	17,250 acres (6,980 ha)
Middle Wild Horse Mesa	Utah	2019	16,343 acres (6,614 ha)
Mormon Mountains	Nevada	2004	157,716 acres (63,825 ha)
Mount Charleston	Nevada	2002	2,142 acres (867 ha)
Mount Irish	Nevada	2004	28,274 acres (11,442 ha)
Mount Logan	Arizona	1984	14,650 acres (5,930 ha)
Mount Moriah	Nevada	1989	8,708 acres (3,524 ha)
Mount Nutt	Arizona	1990	28,080 acres (11,360 ha)
Mount Riley	New Mexico	2019	8,382 acres (3,392 ha)
Mount Tipton	Arizona	1989	31,520 acres (12,760 ha)
Mount Trumbull	Arizona	1984	7,880 acres (3,190 ha)
Mount Wilson	Arizona	1990	23,900 acres (9,700 ha)
Muddy Creek	Utah	2019	98,023 acres (39,669 ha)
Muddy Mountains	Nevada	2002	44,576 acres (18,039 ha)
Muggins Mountains	Arizona	1990	7,711 acres (3,121 ha)
Needle's Eye	Arizona	1990	8,760 acres (3,550 ha)
New Water Mountains	Arizona	1990	24,600 acres (10,000 ha)
Newberry Mountains	California	1994	26,102 acres (10,563 ha)
North Fork Owyhee	Idaho	2009	43,413 acres (17,569 ha)
Nopah Range	California	1994	106,623 acres (43,149 ha)
North Algodones Dunes	California	1994	25,895 acres (10,479 ha)
North Black Rock Range	Nevada	2000	30,648 acres (12,403 ha)
North Forks Owyhee	Idaho	2009, 2019	44,027 acres (17,817 ha)
North Jackson Mountains	Nevada	2000	23,439 acres (9,485 ha)
North Maricopa Mountains	Arizona	1990	63,200 acres (25,600 ha)
North McCullough	Nevada	2002	14,764 acres (5,975 ha)
North Mesquite Mountains	California	1994	28,955 acres (11,718 ha)
North Santa Teresa	Arizona	1990	5,800 acres (2,300 ha)
Ojito	New Mexico	2005	11,183 acres (4,526 ha)
Old Woman Mountains	California	1994	163,616 acres (66,213 ha)
Oregon Badlands	Oregon	2009	29,261 acres (11,842 ha)
Organ Mountains	New Mexico	2019	19,916 acres (8,060 ha)
Orocopia Mountains	California	1994, 2009	55,614 acres (22,506 ha)
Otay Mountain	California	1994	1,685 acres (682 ha)
Owens Peak	California	1994	73,797 acres (29,865 ha)
Owyhee River	Idaho	2009, 2019	270,846 acres (109,607 ha)
Pahrump Valley	California	1994	73,724 acres (29,835 ha)
Pahute Peak	Nevada	2000	56,890 acres (23,020 ha)
Paiute	Arizona	1984	87,900 acres (35,600 ha)
Palen/McCoy	California	1984, 2009	259,009 acres (104,817 ha)
Palo Verde Mountains	California	1994, 2019	39,955 acres (16,169 ha)
Paria Canyon-Vermilion Cliffs	Arizona, Utah	1984	110,722 acres (44,808 ha)
Parsnip Peak	Nevada	2004	43,512 acres (17,609 ha)
Peloncillo Mountains	Arizona	1990	19,440 acres (7,870 ha)
Picacho Peak	California	1994	8,858 acres (3,585 ha)
Pine Forest Range	Nevada	2014	24,015 acres (9,719 ha)
Pinto Mountains	California	2009	24,374 acres (9,864 ha)
Piper Mountain	California	1994	72,191 acres (29,215 ha)
Piute Mountains	California	1994	48,080 acres (19,460 ha)
Pole Creek	Idaho	2009, 2019	12,556 acres (5,081 ha)
Potrillo Mountains	New Mexico	2019	105,085 acres (42,526 ha)
Powderhorn	Colorado	1993	47,980 acres (19,420 ha)
Rainbow Mountain	Nevada	2002	20,313 acres (8,220 ha)
Rawhide Mountains	Arizona	1990	38,470 acres (15,570 ha)
Red Butte	Utah	2009	1,535 acres (621 ha)
Redfield Canyon	Arizona	1990	6,600 acres (2,700 ha)
Red Mountain	Utah	2009	18,689 acres (7,563 ha)
Red's Canyon	Utah	2019	17,325 acres (7,011 ha)
Resting Spring Range	California	1994	76,309 acres (30,881 ha)
Rice Valley	California	1994	41,766 acres (16,902 ha)
Rio San Antonio	New Mexico	2019	8,120 acres (3,290 ha)
Riverside Mountains	California	1994	24,004 acres (9,714 ha)
Robledo Mountains	New Mexico	2019	16,776 acres (6,789 ha)
Rocks and Islands	California	2006	19 acres (7.7 ha)
Rodman Mountains	California	1994	34,320 acres (13,890 ha)
Sabinoso	New Mexico	2009	29,242 acres (11,834 ha)
Sacatar Trail	California	1994	50,440 acres (20,410 ha)
Saddle Peak Hills	California	1994	1,530 acres (620 ha)
San Gorgonio	California	1994	39,231 acres (15,876 ha)
San Rafael Reef	Utah	2019	60,442 acres (24,460 ha)
Santa Lucia	California	1978	1,807 acres (731 ha)
Santa Rosa	California	1994, 2009	60,917 acres (24,652 ha)
Sawtooth Mountains	California	1994	33,610 acres (13,600 ha)
Sheephole Valley	California	1994	187,516 acres (75,885 ha)
Sid's Mountain	Utah	2019	49,130 acres (19,880 ha)
Sierra de las Uvas	New Mexico	2019	11,114 acres (4,498 ha)
Sierra Estrella	Arizona	1990	14,400 acres (5,800 ha)
Signal Mountain	Arizona	1990	13,350 acres (5,400 ha)
Slaughter Creek	Utah	2009	4,047 acres (1,638 ha)
Soda Mountain	Oregon	2009	24,707 acres (9,999 ha)
Soda Mountains	California	2019	80,090 acres (32,410 ha)
South Egan Range	Nevada	2006	67,214 acres (27,201 ha)
South Fork Eel River	California	2006	12,867 acres (5,207 ha)
South Jackson Mountains	Nevada	2000	54,536 acres (22,070 ha)
South Maricopa Mountains	Arizona	1990	60,100 acres (24,300 ha)
South McCullough	Nevada	2002	44,244 acres (17,905 ha)
South Nopah Range	California	1994	17,060 acres (6,900 ha)
South Pahroc Range	Nevada	2004	25,671 acres (10,389 ha)
Spirit Mountain	Nevada	2002	605 acres (245 ha)
Spring Basin	Oregon	2009	6,378 acres (2,581 ha)
Stateline	California	1994	6,963 acres (2,818 ha)
Steens Mountain	Oregon	2000	170,166 acres (68,864 ha)
Stepladder Mountains	California	1994	83,204 acres (33,671 ha)
Surprise Canyon	California	1994	24,429 acres (9,886 ha)
Swansea	Arizona	1990	16,400 acres (6,600 ha)
Sylvania Mountains	California	1994	18,682 acres (7,560 ha)
Table Rock	Oregon	1984	5,781 acres (2,339 ha)
Table Top	Arizona	1990	34,400 acres (13,900 ha)
Taylor Creek	Utah	2009	35 acres (14 ha)
Tres Alamos	Arizona	1990	8,300 acres (3,400 ha)
Trigo Mountains	Arizona	1990	30,300 acres (12,300 ha)
Trilobite	California	1994	37,308 acres (15,098 ha)
Tunnel Spring	Nevada	2004	5,341 acres (2,161 ha)
Turtle Canyon	Utah	2019	29,029 acres (11,748 ha)
Turtle Mountains	California	1994	177,209 acres (71,714 ha)
Uncompahgre	Colorado	1993	3,390 acres (1,370 ha)
Upper Burro Creek	Arizona	1990	27,440 acres (11,100 ha)
Ventana	California	2002	720 acres (290 ha)
Wabayuma Peak	Arizona	1990	38,944 acres (15,760 ha)
Warm Springs	Arizona	1990	112,400 acres (45,500 ha)
Wee Thump Joshua Tree	Nevada	2002	6,050 acres (2,450 ha)
Weepah Spring	Nevada	2004	24,249 acres (9,813 ha)
West Malpais	New Mexico	1987	39,540 acres (16,000 ha)
Whipple Mountains	California	1994	76,122 acres (30,805 ha)
White Canyon	Arizona	1990	5,800 acres (2,300 ha)
White Clouds	Idaho	2015	450 acres (180 ha)
Whitehorn	New Mexico	2019	9,616 acres (3,891 ha)
White Mountains	California	2009	24,162 acres (9,778 ha)
White Rock Range	Nevada	2004	24,249 acres (9,813 ha)
Wild Rogue	Oregon	1978	8,595 acres (3,478 ha)
Woolsey Peak	Arizona	1990	64,000 acres (26,000 ha)
Worthington Mountains	Nevada	2004	30,594 acres (12,381 ha)
Yolla Bolly–Middle Eel	California	1984	8,512 acres (3,445 ha) (BLM only)
Yuki Wilderness	California	2006	17,195 acres (6,959 ha)

=== Wilderness study areas ===
There are 487 wilderness study areas with a total area of 11,118,496 acres (4,499,496 ha).

=== National historic trails ===
As of January 2026, there are 14 sites totaling 5,336 miles (8,587 km).

Distances and states are noted for BLM lands only.

Historic trail	BLM states	BLM distance
California	CA, ID, NV, OR, UT, WY	1,493 miles (2,403 km)
Captain John Smith Chesapeake	MD	2 miles (3.2 km)
El Camino Real de Tierra Adentro	NM	60 miles (97 km)
Iditarod	AK	149 miles (240 km)
Juan Bautista de Anza	AZ, CA	103 miles (166 km)
Lewis and Clark	ID, MT	369 miles (594 km)
Mormon Pioneer	WY	498 miles (801 km)
Nez Perce	ID, MT, WY	70 miles (110 km)
Old Spanish	AZ, CA, CO, NV, NM, UT	887 miles (1,427 km)
Oregon	ID, OR, WY	848 miles (1,365 km)
Pony Express	NV, UT, WY	596 miles (959 km)
Star-Spangled Banner	MD	2 miles (3.2 km)
Washington-Rochambeau Revolutionary Route	VA	1 mile (1.6 km)

=== National scenic trails ===
As of January 2026, there are 5 units totaling 683 miles (1,099 km).

Distances and states are noted for BLM lands only.

Scenic trail	BLM states	BLM distance
Arizona	AZ	46 miles (74 km)
Continental Divide	CO, ID, MT, NM, WY	389 miles (626 km)
Pacific Crest	CA, OR	233 miles (375 km)
Pacific Northwest	WA	12 miles (19 km)
Potomac Heritage	MD	2 miles (3.2 km)

=== National wild and scenic rivers ===
As of January 2026, there are 81 sites, totaling 2,698.8 miles (4,343.3 km). The land within these sites total 1,207,694 acres (488,736 ha).

=== Other ===
As of January 2026, there are 7 sites totaling 454,723 acres (184,020 ha). (Note: This number excludes the National Conservation Lands of the California Desert.)

Site	State	Established	Federal area	Non-Federal area	Total area
Alabama Hills National Scenic Area	California	2019	18,910 acres (7,650 ha)	0 acres (0 ha)	18,910 acres (7,650 ha)
Headwaters Forest Reserve	California	1999	7,472 acres (3,024 ha)	0 acres (0 ha)	7,472 acres (3,024 ha)
Jupiter Inlet Lighthouse Outstanding Natural Area	Florida	2008	107 acres (43 ha)	13 acres (5.3 ha)	120 acres (49 ha)
National Conservation Lands of the California Desert	California	2016			
Piedras Blancas Light Station Outstanding Natural Area	California	2008	20 acres (8.1 ha)	456 acres (185 ha)	476 acres (193 ha)
Steens Mountain Cooperative Management and Protection Area	Oregon	2000	428,440 acres (173,380 ha)	68,720 acres (27,810 ha)	497,160 acres (201,190 ha)
Yaquina Head Outstanding Natural Area	Oregon	1980	100 acres (40 ha)	0 acres (0 ha)	100 acres (40 ha)

== See also ==
- Protected areas of the United States
- List of national conservation lands in Colorado
- List of national monuments of the United States
- List of areas in the United States National Park System
