= List of national conservation lands in Colorado =

Coordinates: 38.9972°N 105.5478°W

This is a list of National Conservation Lands managed by the Bureau of Land Management in the U.S. State of Colorado. The Bureau of Land Management manages the National Landscape Conservation System in the Western United States.

== National Monuments ==
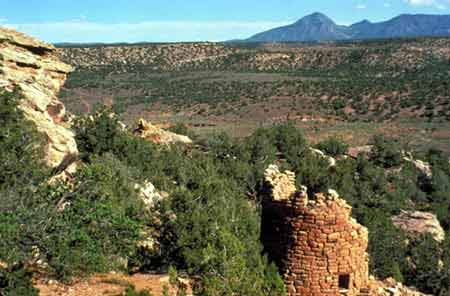
Canyons of the Ancients National Monument.

The Bureau of Land Management manages two of the eight National Monuments in Colorado:

- Browns Canyon National Monument (Note: Jointly managed by the United States Department of the Interior, Bureau of Land Management and the United States Department of Agriculture, United States Forest Service.)
- Canyons of the Ancients National Monument

== National Conservation Areas ==
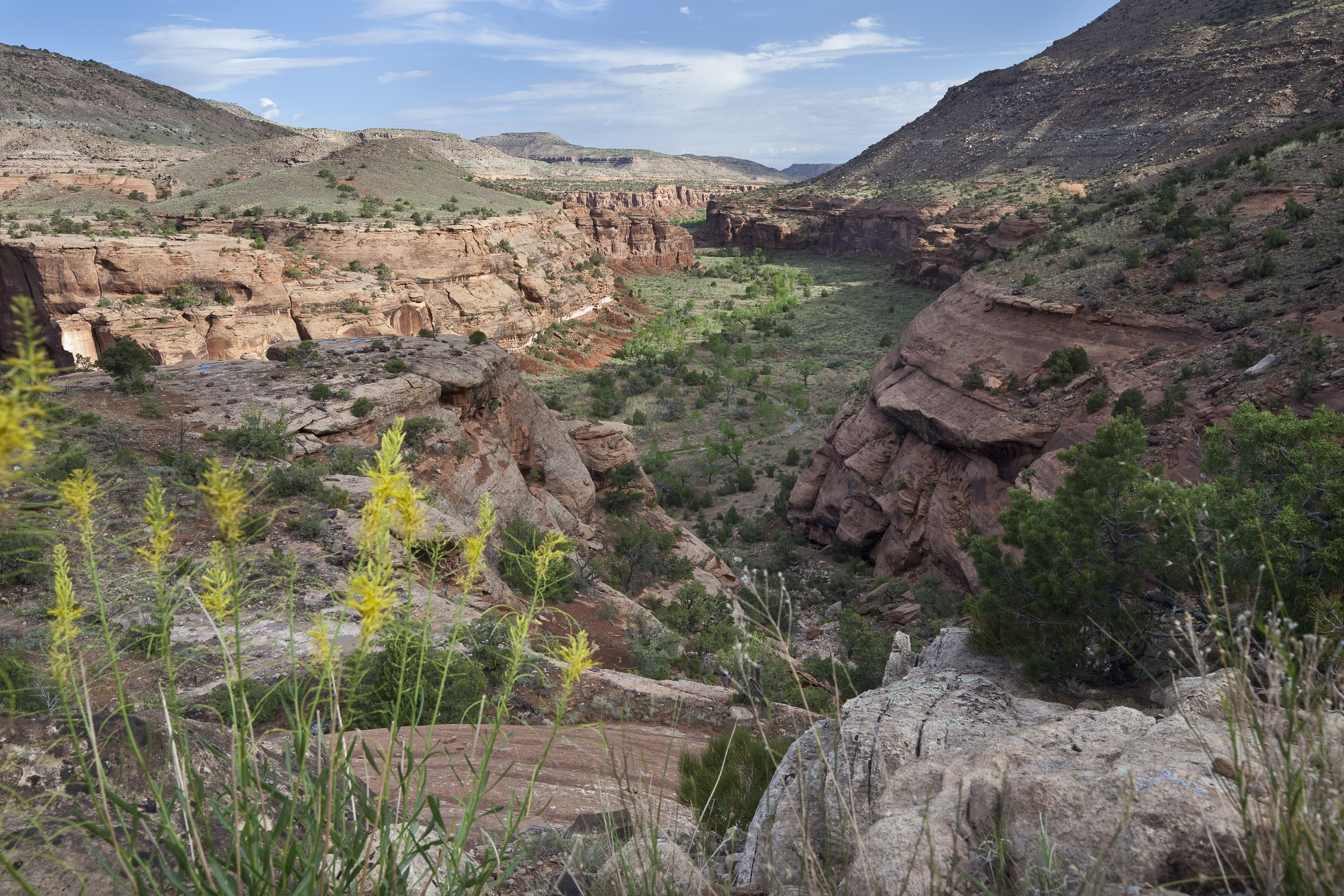
The Dominguez–Escalante National Conservation Area.

The Bureau of Land Management manages the three National Conservation Areas within Colorado.

- Dominguez–Escalante National Conservation Area
- Gunnison Gorge National Conservation Area
- McInnis Canyons National Conservation Area

== National Wildernesses ==
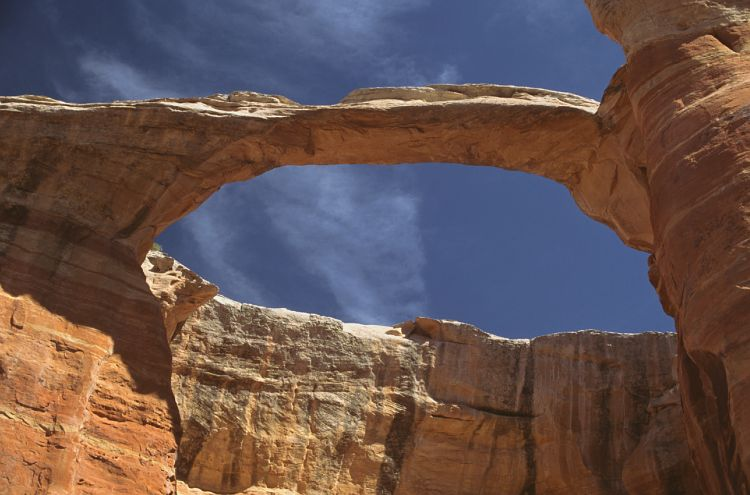
East Rim Arch in the Black Ridge Canyons Wilderness.

The Bureau of Land Management manages five of the 44 National Wildernesses within Colorado.

- Black Ridge Canyons Wilderness
- Dominguez Canyon Wilderness
- Gunnison Gorge Wilderness
- Powderhorn Wilderness
- Uncompahgre Wilderness

== National Historic Trails ==
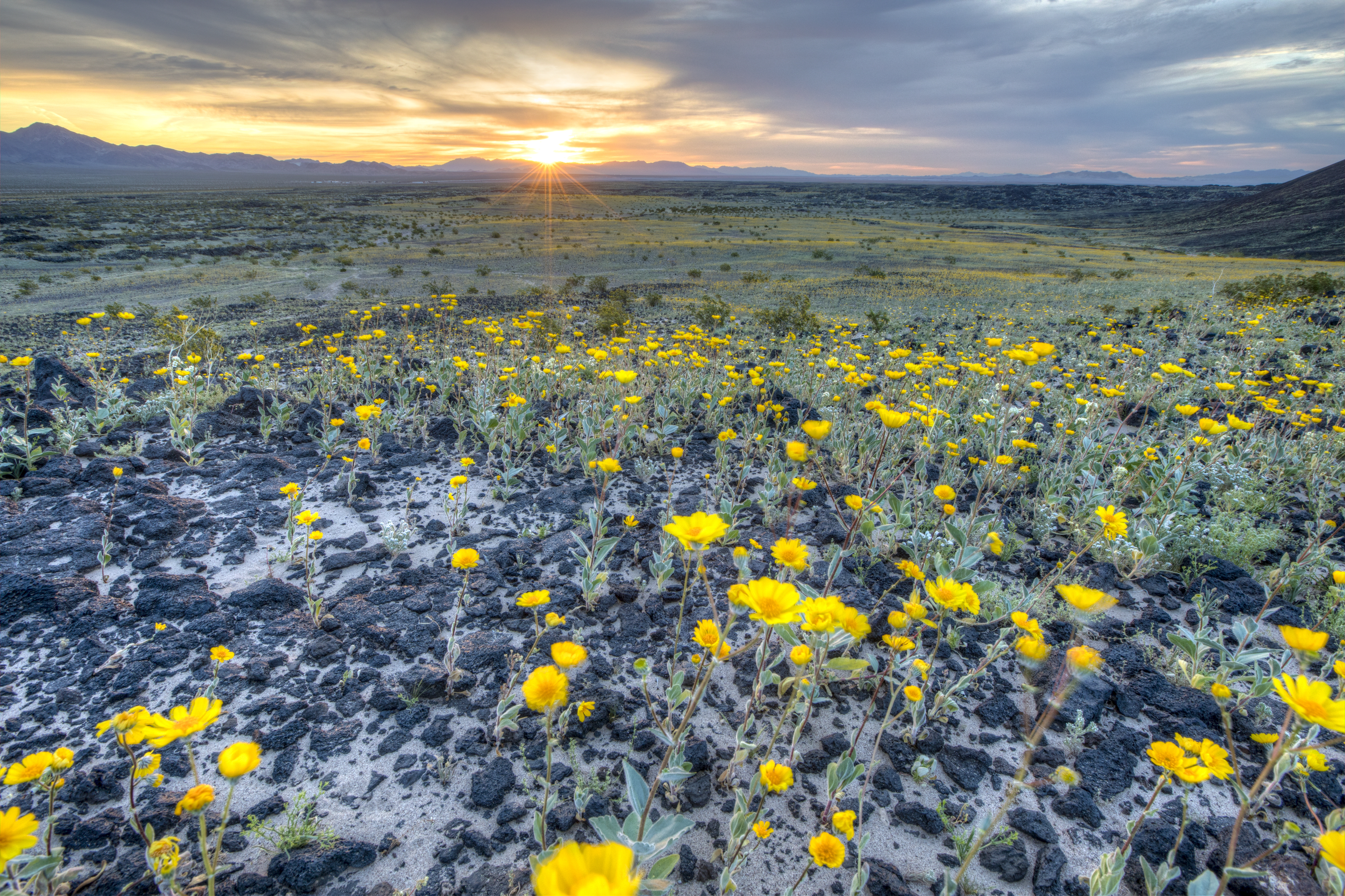
The Old Spanish National Historic Trail.

The Bureau of Land Management manages portions of one of the four National Historic Trails that pass through Colorado:

- Old Spanish National Historic Trail (Note: The Old Spanish National Historic Trail traverses six U.S. states: New Mexico, Colorado, Utah, Arizona, Nevada, and California.)

== National Scenic Trail ==
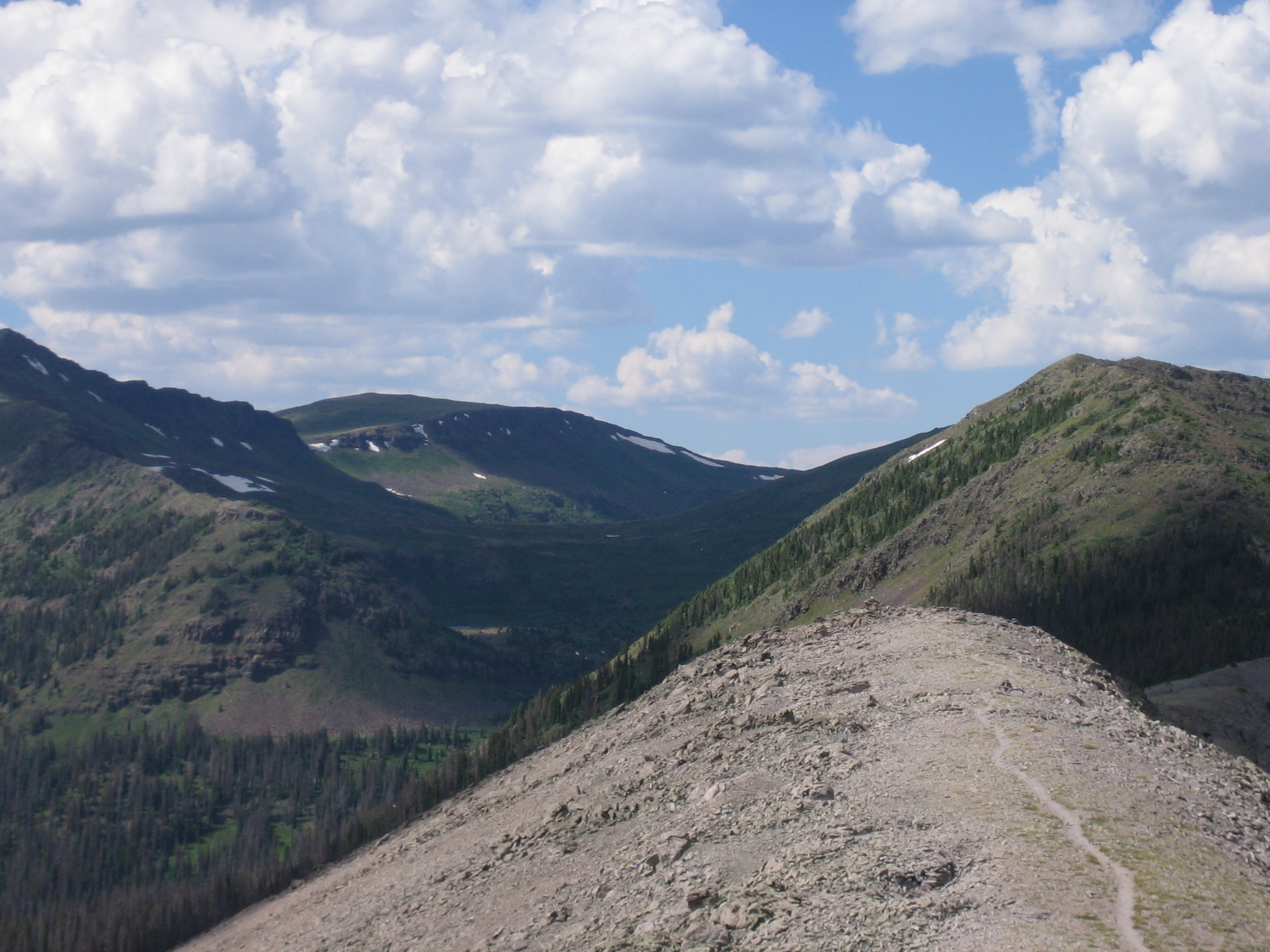
The Continental Divide National Scenic Trail in the Weminuche Wilderness.

The Bureau of Land Management manages portions of the National Scenic Trail that passes through Colorado:

- Continental Divide National Scenic Trail (Note: The Continental Divide National Scenic Trail traverses five U.S. states: Montana, Idaho, Wyoming, Colorado, and New Mexico.)

== Other federal lands ==
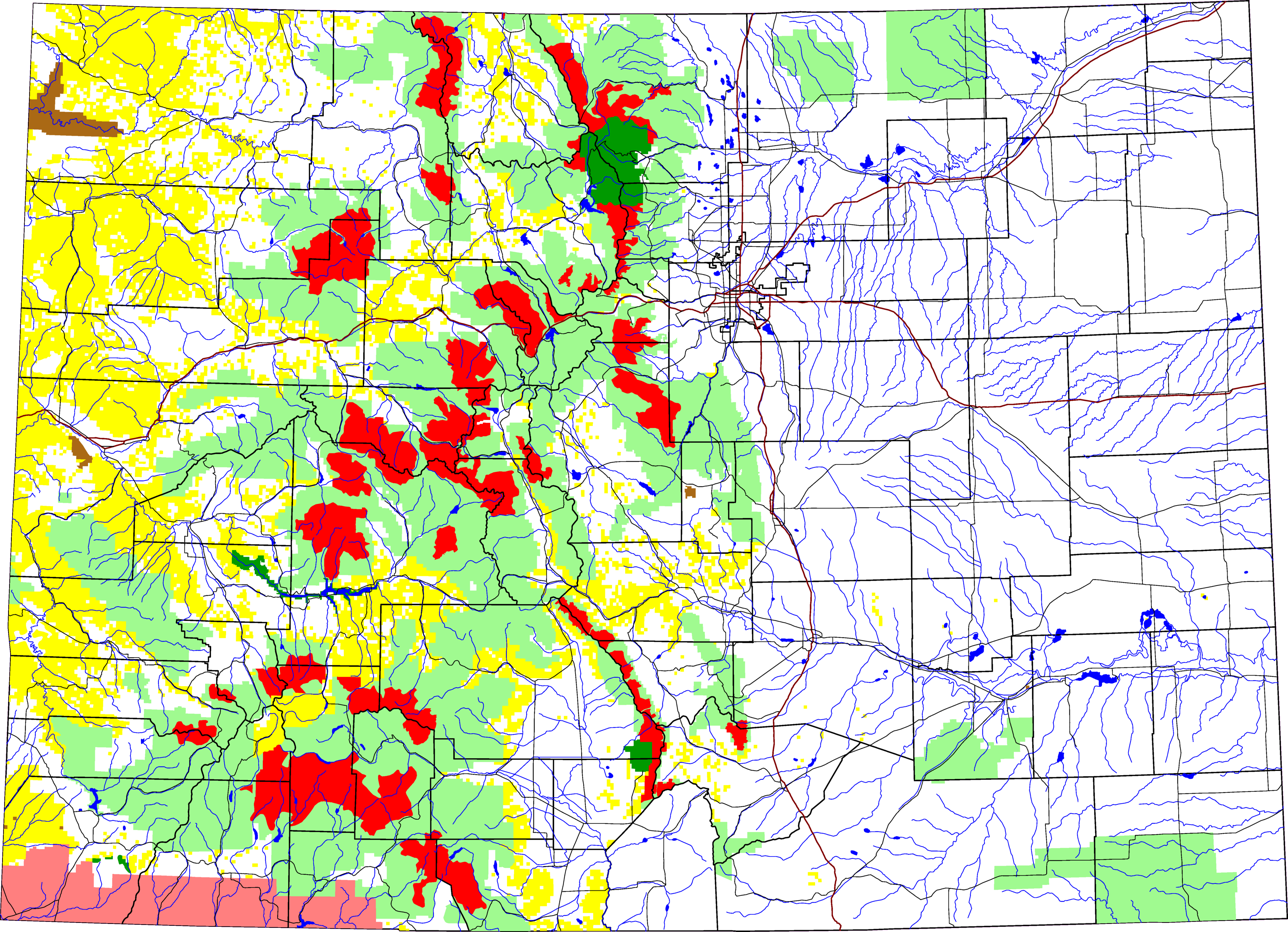
An enlargeable map of Colorado showing land managed by the Bureau of Land Management in yellow .

The Bureau of Land Management manages the extensive federal land holdings in western Colorado not managed by another federal agency.

=== Areas of Critical Environmental Concern ===
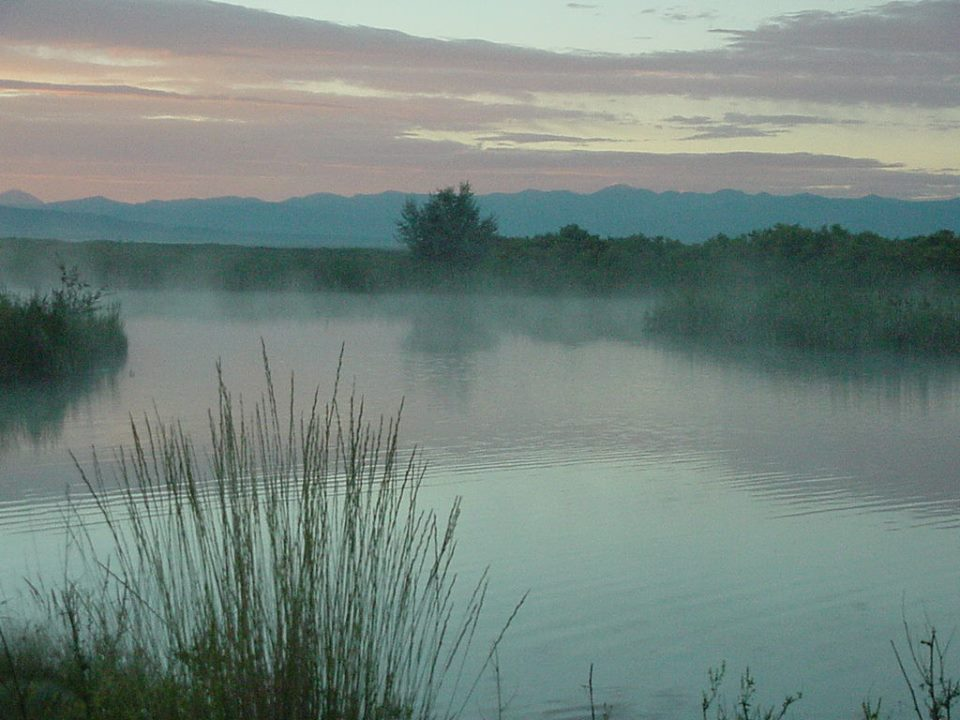
The Blanca Wetlands ACEC.

The Bureau of Land Management has designated 88 Areas of Critical Environmental Concern in Western Colorado.

== See also ==
- List of protected areas of Colorado
- Bibliography of Colorado
- Geography of Colorado
- History of Colorado
- Index of Colorado-related articles
- List of Colorado-related lists
- Outline of Colorado
