= Blackridge =

Blackridge or Black Ridge may refer to:

- Blackridge, West Lothian, Scotland
  - Blackridge railway station
- Blackridge, Pennsylvania, U.S.
- Blackridge railway station, Queensland
- Blackridge Wilderness, Utah, U.S.
- Black Ridge (Antarctica)
- Black Ridge Canyons Wilderness, Colorado and Utah, U.S.
