= Rattlesnake Canyon =

Rattlesnake Canyon is the name of a number of scenic canyons in the Southwestern United States:

- Rattlesnake Canyon (Arizona), a slot canyon near Antelope Canyon
- Rattlesnake Canyon (Santa Barbara), lies within Skofield Park, in Santa Barbara, California
- Rattlesnake Canyon (Colorado), lies within the Black Ridge Canyons Wilderness and is noted for its natural arches
- Rattlesnake Canyon (New Mexico), lies within Carlsbad Caverns National Park
- Rattlesnake Canyon Dam, a dam in Irvine, California
- Rattlesnake Canyon Site, noted for its pictographs, NRHP in Val Verde County, Texas
- Rattlesnake Canyon, Wyoming in Carbon County, Wyoming

Other places with Rattlesnake Canyon in their name:

- Rattlesnake Canyon (amusement park), an amusement park in Osoyoos, British Columbia
