= Verkin =

Verkin, Verkina, LaVerkin or La Verkin may refer to

- La Verkin, Utah, a city in Utah, United States
  - LaVerkin Creek Wilderness in Utah
  - Hurricane-LaVerkin Bridge over the Virgin River in Utah
- Verkin Institute for Low Temperature Physics and Engineering in Kharkiv, Ukraine
- Kazimír Verkin (born 1972), Slovak race walker
