= BRCW =

BRCW may refer to:

- Birmingham Railway Carriage and Wagon Company, railway locomotive and carriage builder
- Black Ridge Canyons Wilderness, Wilderness located in western Colorado
- Boca Raton Championship Wrestling, American independent professional wrestling promotion based in Boca Raton, Florida
