= Mee Canyon =

Remote scenic area within the Black Ridge Canyons Wilderness

Coordinates: 39°09′31″N 108°57′14″W

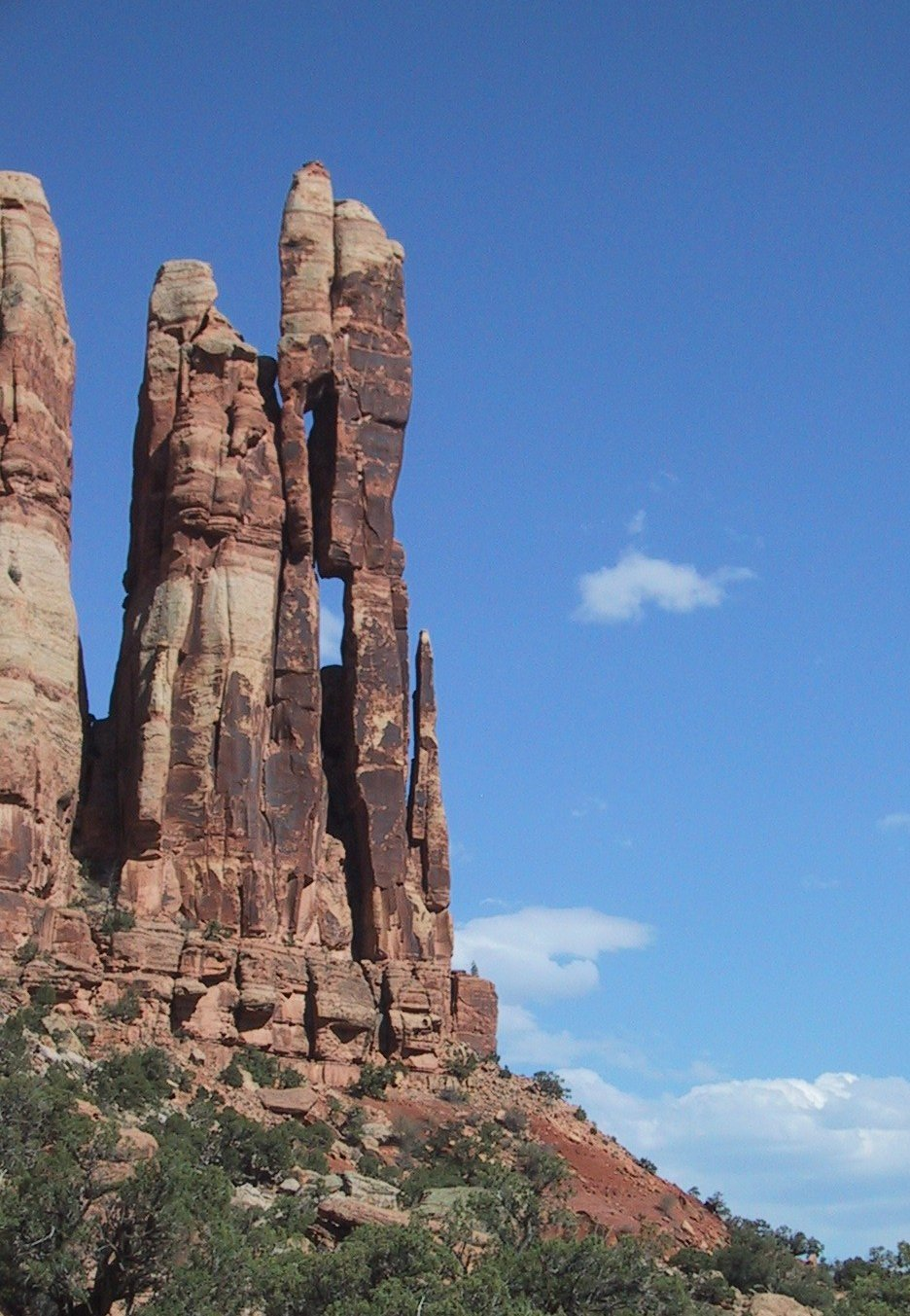
Arch Tower, in Mee Canyon

Mee Canyon is a remote scenic area within the Black Ridge Canyons Wilderness which in turn forms the core of the Bureau of Land Management administered McInnis Canyons National Conservation Area in west central Colorado. Limited access and primitive facilities limit visitation and help preserve the wilderness in its natural state.

Mee Canyon is accessed either by boat from the Colorado River, or from a trail head near Glade Park.

== Notable features ==
- Arch Tower is a 375-foot-tall (114 m) Wingate Sandstone tower that contains a natural arch. This tower was first climbed in 2003.
- There is a 100 feet deep alcove eroded into the soft sandstone by a year-round stream. The stream flows through it around a large rubble pile in the center which has fallen in from the ceiling.
