= Sylvania Mountains =

Mountain range in California and Nevada, US

- Location within Nevada

Highest point
- Elevation: 2,416 m (7,927 ft)

Geography
- Country: United States
- State(s): California and Nevada
- District(s): Inyo County, California and Esmeralda County, Nevada
- Range coordinates: 37°24′0″N 117°43′0″W
- Topo map: USGS Sylvania Mountains

The Sylvania Mountains are located in Inyo County, California, and Esmeralda County, Nevada, in the United States. The range trends in an east–west direction, north of the Last Chance Range at the northern end of Death Valley National Park.

The Last Chance Range and Death Valley are to the south, Slate Ridge is to the southeast, and the Palmetto Mountains are adjacent to the east.

== Sylvania Mountains Wilderness ==
The Sylvania Mountains Wilderness protects over 18,000 acres (73 km^{2}) of the range in California. It is managed by the Bureau of Land Management.
