= Buzzards Peak Wilderness =

Protected wilderness area in California, United States

- IUCN category Ib (wilderness area)
- Location within California Location within the United States
- Location: Imperial County, California, USA
- Nearest city: Blythe, CA
- Coordinates: 33.0496042°N 115.1136383°W
- Area: 11,840 acres (48 km^{2})
- Established: 2019
- Governing body: U.S. Department of Interior Bureau of Land Management

Buzzards Peak Wilderness is a protected wilderness area to the southeast of the Milpitas Wash Wilderness separated by California State Route 78 in Imperial County, California. Established in 2019 by the U.S. Congress, the area is managed by the Bureau of Land Management. Indian Pass Wilderness, Imperial National Wildlife Refuge and the Colorado River are to the south and southeast. Wildlife includes the desert tortoise, Yuma kingsnake, Colorado River toad, Great Plains toad, tree lizard, burros, mule deer and mountain lion. Vegetation found in the area: cholla and beavertail cactus, ocotillo, palo verde, acacia, ironwood, and the rare California Ditaxis.

== See also ==
- List of U.S. Wilderness Areas
