= Rattlesnake Canyon (Colorado) =

Coordinates: 39°09′54″N 108°51′44″W

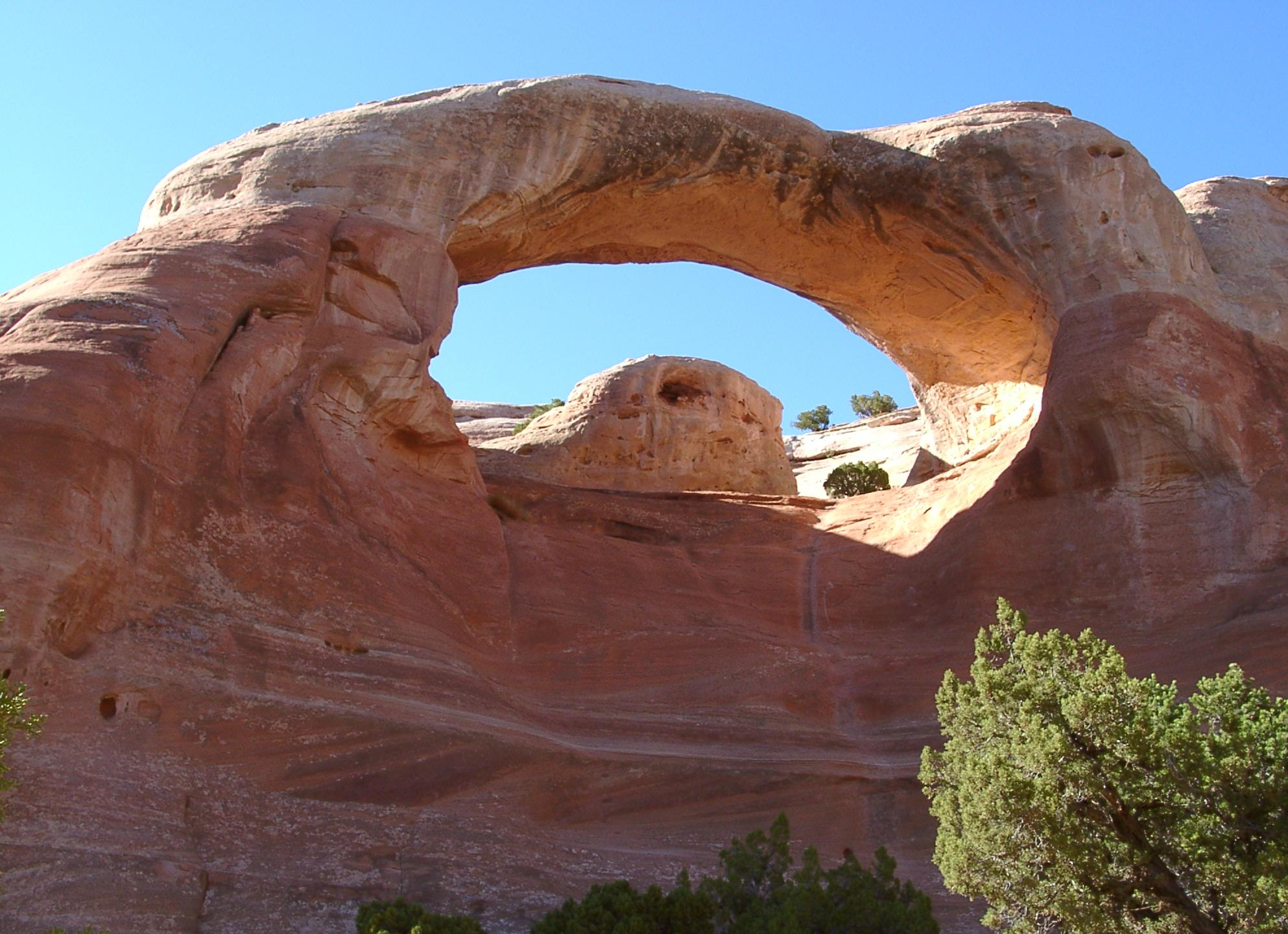
The arches loop trail starts with a tricky descent through Cedar Tree Arch.

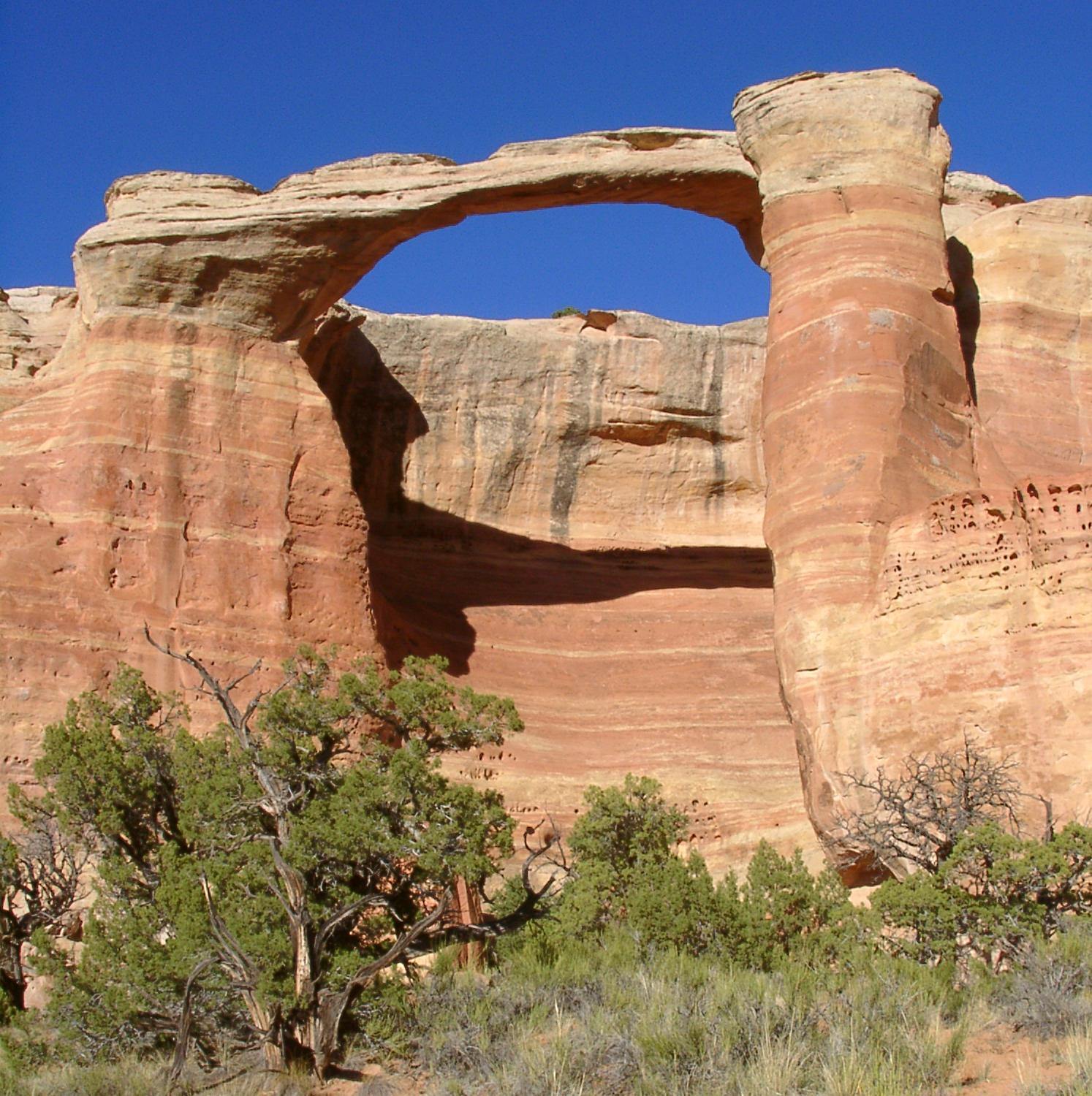
East Rim Arch viewed from the arches loop trail.

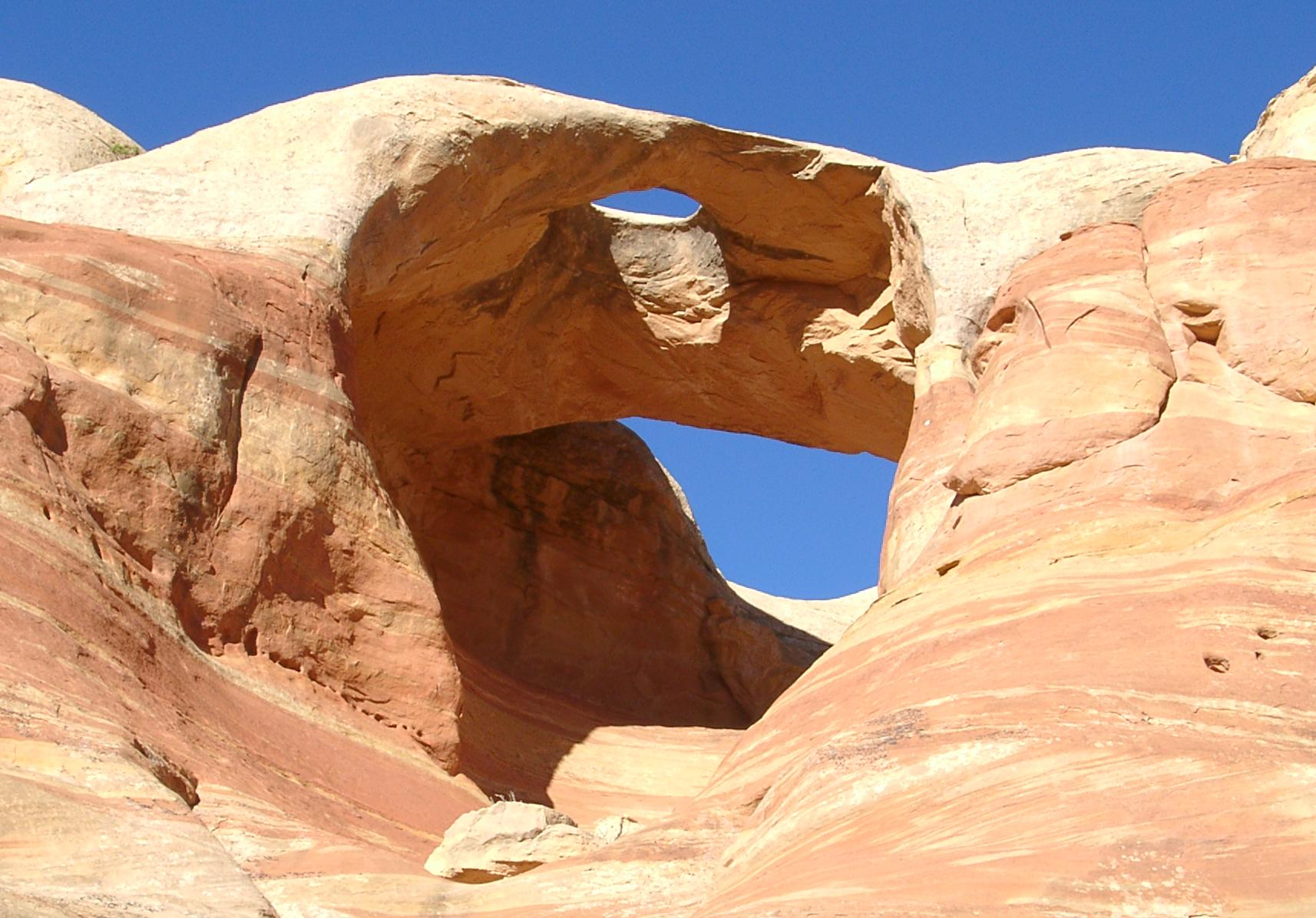
Bridge Arch viewed from the arches loop trail.

Rattlesnake Canyon is a scenic area within the Black Ridge Canyons Wilderness which in turn forms the core of the Bureau of Land Management administered McInnis Canyons National Conservation Area in west central Colorado. The canyon contains nine natural arches, the second highest concentration of such arches in the United States, after the much better known Arches National Park.

Access to the canyon is either by a strenuous seven mile hike from the Pollack Bench trailhead or by the Black Ridge access roads. The latter are reached via the adjacent Colorado National Monument. These dirt roads are open seasonally and should only be attempted in a high ground clearance four wheel drive vehicle under dry conditions due to steep, rocky grades.

The arches loop trail descends and then circumnavigates a bench into the canyon. It passes six arches before arriving at Cedar Tree Arch. A slightly tricky ascent on steep sandstone slopes and moqui steps leads to the top of the canyon and a trail spur that completes the circuit.

== Notable features ==
- Cedar Tree Arch (also known as Rainbow Arch) has a span of 76 feet and an opening height of 43 feet.
- East Rim Arch (also known as Akiti Arch or Centennial Arch) has a span of 40 feet and an opening height of 120 feet.
- Bridge Arch (also known as Hole-in-the-Bridge Arch) has a span of 40 feet and an opening height of 30 feet.
