= Palmetto Mountains =

Mountain range in Nevada, United States

- Location within Nevada

Highest point
- Peak: Blue Dick Benchmark
- Elevation: 2,831 m (9,288 ft)

Geography
- Country: United States
- State: Nevada
- District: Esmeralda County
- Range coordinates: 37°28′35.752″N 117°34′27.308″W
- Topo map: USGS Magruder Mountain

The Palmetto Mountains are a mountain range in Esmeralda County, Nevada. The Lida Mining District and Lida, Nevada are located in the range.

The mountains are east of the Sylvania Mountains and north of the Slate Range and Death Valley. It is a sub-range of the Silver Peak Range further northwest. Blue Dick Benchmark, at 9,289 ft above sea level, is the highest point of the Palmettos.

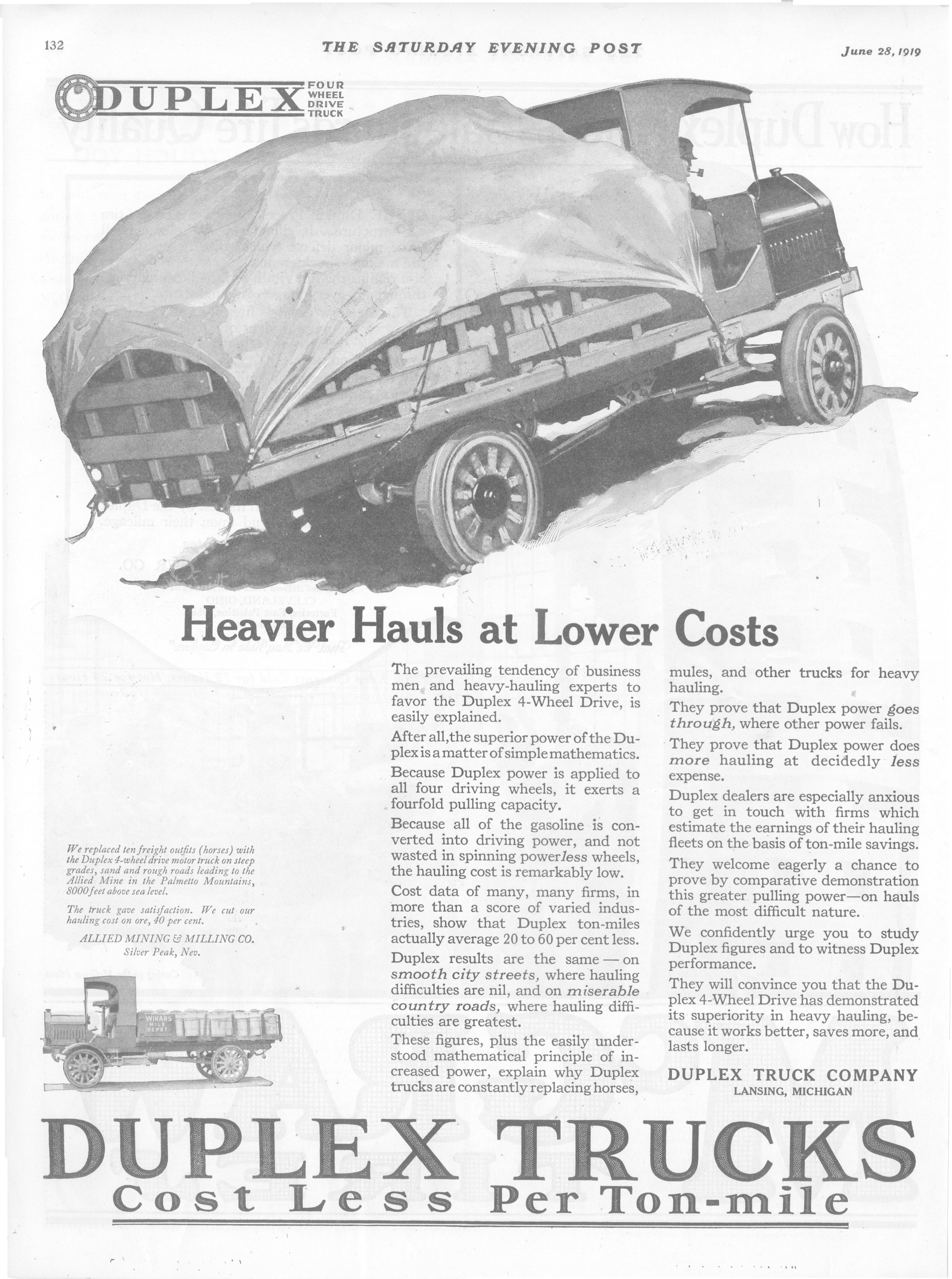
Advertisement for Duplex Trucks (Lansing, Michigan) from the Saturday Evening Post, June 28, 1919.The ad includes a sidebar:"We replaced ten freight outfits (horses) with the Duplex 4-wheel drive motor truck on steep grades, sand and rough roads leading to the Palmetto Mountains, 8000 feet above sea level.""The truck gave satisfaction. We cut our handling cost on ore 40 per cent.""Allied Mining and Milling Co.""Silver Peak, Nev."
