= John Wesley Powell National Conservation Area =

Protected area in Utah, United States

- IUCN category V (protected landscape/seascape)
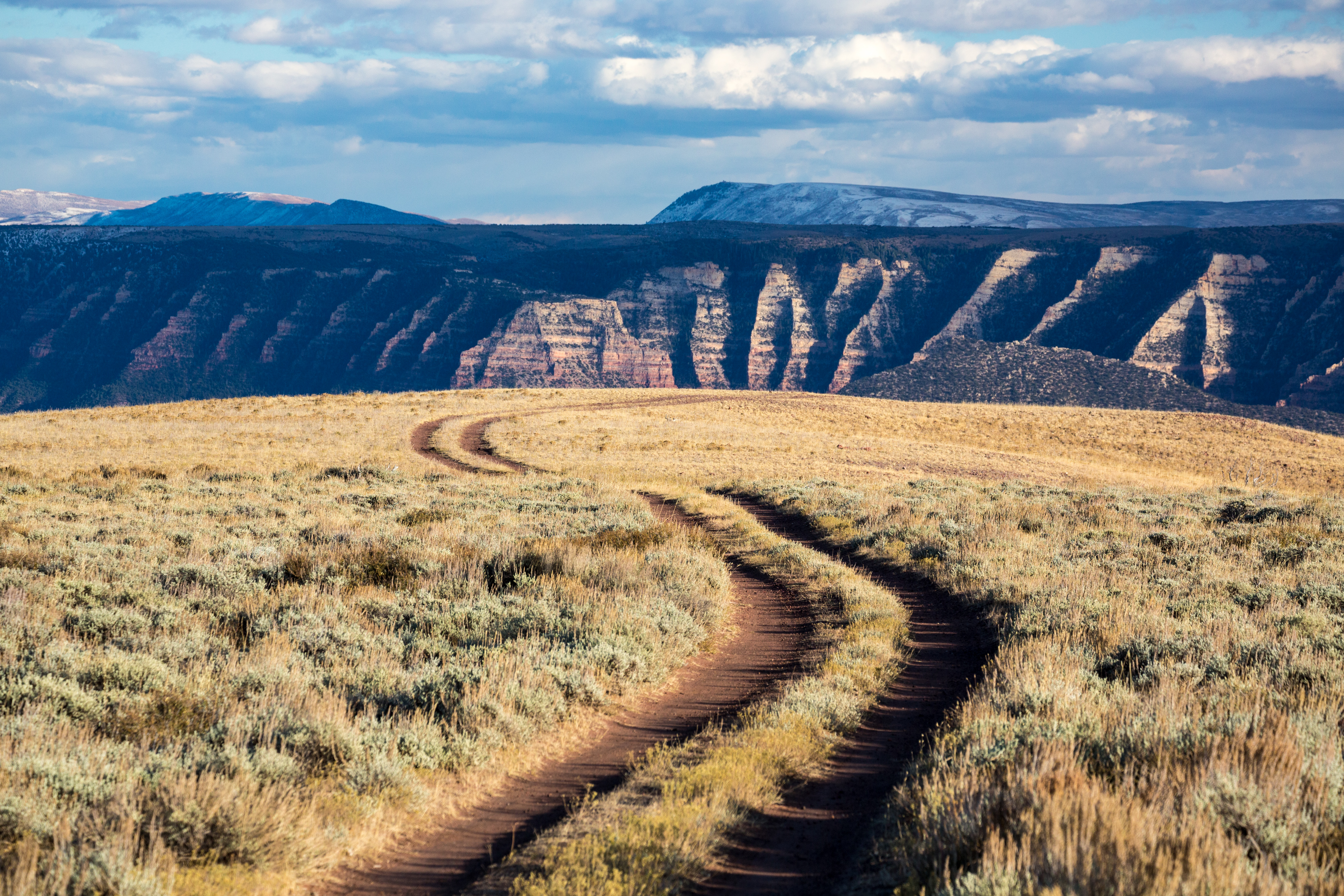
- John Wesley Powell National Conservation Area
- Interactive map of John Wesley Powell National Conservation Area
- Location: Uintah County, Utah, United States
- Nearest city: Vernal, Utah
- Coordinates: 40°36′N 109°10′W
- Area: 29,868 acres (120.87 km^{2})
- Established: 2019
- Governing body: Bureau of Land Management
- Website: Official website

The John Wesley Powell National Conservation Area is a 29,868-acre (120.87 km^{2}) United States national conservation area located in northeast Utah east of Vernal along the northern boundary of Dinosaur National Monument. It is managed by the U.S. Bureau of Land Management as part of the National Landscape Conservation System, and was authorized in the John D. Dingell, Jr. Conservation, Management, and Recreation Act.

The national conservation area is named for John Wesley Powell, who first explored the Green River and Colorado River in 1869. The area's founding coincided with the 150-year anniversary of the journey.

As of 2022, there were no developed recreation sites, designated trails or visitor use facilities in John Wesley Powell National Conservation Area. The primary visitor activities are hunting and motorized recreation. Species found in the national conservation include the white-tailed prairie dog, mule deer, milkweed and the Flaming Gorge evening primrose.
