= Sylvania Mountains Wilderness =

Protected wilderness area in California, United States

- IUCN category Ib (wilderness area)
- Location within California Location within the United States
- Interactive map of Sylvania Mountains Wilderness
- Location: Inyo County, California, United States
- Nearest city: Bishop, California
- Coordinates: 37°22′41″N 117°46′26″W
- Area: 18,682 acres (7,560 ha)
- Established: 1994
- Governing body: Bureau of Land Management

The Sylvania Mountains Wilderness is a federally designated wilderness area located 30 miles (48 km) east of Bishop in the state of California. The wilderness is 18,677acres in size and is managed by the Bureau of Land Management (BLM). The California Desert Protection Act of 1994 created the Sylvania Mountains Wilderness and was added to the National Wilderness Preservation System. The wilderness is bordered by Nevada stateline on the east, Piper Mountain Wilderness on the west and Death Valley National Park to the south.

== Geography ==
The Sylvania Mountains are a subrange of the Last Chance Mountains and straddle the California-Nevada border. There is no distinct crest, only rounded summits and ridges with many canyons, drainages and bahadas (fans of alluvial soil that have combined at the base of canyons). Elevations range from 4,640 to 7,970 feet (1,410 to 2,430 m).

== Flora and fauna ==
There are limited water sources, but the springs that do exist support mule deer, desert bighorn sheep, chukar, coyote, as well as ground squirrels and lizards.

The wilderness flora is a mixture of Mojave Desert and Great Basin plant life. Joshua trees are numerous, as well as desert tea, hop sage, cheesebush, deerhorn cholla and in the highest elevations, single-leaf pinyon, big sagebrush and Utah juniper. Rare plants in the area include fernleaf fleabane (Erigeron compactus), a native perennial wildflower, and Mormon needlegrass (Eriocoma arida), a native perennial that grows in Joshua Tree and Pinyon-juniper woodland communities.

== Recreation ==
The hiking trails are closed four-wheel-drive roads and rise gradually from the bahada to pinyon woodlands in the higher elevations. The most rugged area is the White Cliff Canyon in the eastern portion with cliffs rising 800 feet (240 m) above the canyon floor. The wilderness is very seldom visited due to a lack of water and extreme temperatures in the summer months. Wildflower season is from March through May.

Relics of mining activity are still present both within the wilderness and along the mountain range into Nevada.

== See also ==
- Piper Mountain Wilderness
- Death Valley National Park
- Pack it in, pack it out
- Environmental ethics
