= Tres Alamos Wilderness =

Protected area in Yavapai County, Arizona

- IUCN category Ib (wilderness area)
- Location within the United States
- Location: Yavapai County, Arizona, USA
- Nearest town: Congress, AZ
- Coordinates: 34.236804°N 113.192865°W
- Area: 8,300 acres (34 km^{2})
- Established: 1990
- Governing body: U.S. Department of Interior Bureau of Land Management

Tres Alamos Wilderness is a protected wilderness area centered around the southern portion of the Black Mountains and the range high point of Sawyer Peak in the U.S. state of Arizona. The namesake feature, Tres Alamos, is a prominent and colorful monolith in the mountains. Established in 1990 under the Arizona Desert Wilderness Act the area is managed by the Bureau of Land Management.

The area is a classic example of Sonoran-Mojave Desert transition zone. Vegetation includes creosote bushes and Joshua trees, as well as saguaro cactus and palo verde. Wildlife includes prairie falcons, golden eagles, and Gila monsters.

== See also ==
- List of Arizona Wilderness Areas
- List of U.S. Wilderness Areas
