= Milpitas Wash Wilderness =

Protected wilderness area in California, United States

- IUCN category Ib (wilderness area)
- Location within the United States
- Location: Imperial County, California, USA
- Nearest city: Blythe, CA
- Coordinates: 33.1043005°N 114.9604996°W
- Area: 17,250 acres (70 km^{2})
- Established: 2019
- Governing body: U.S. Department of Interior Bureau of Land Management

Milpitas Wash Wilderness is a protected wilderness area to the south of the Palo Verde Mountains and to the west of Cibola National Wildlife Refuge and the Colorado River in Imperial County, California. Established in 2019 by the U.S. Congress, the area is managed by the Bureau of Land Management. Wildlife includes the desert tortoise, mountain lion, long-eared owl, leaf nosed bat, Merriam's and desert kangaroo rat, long-tailed and little pocket mice, Bullock's and hooded orioles, towhees, white-crowned sparrow, Brewer's sparrow, warbler, black-headed grosbeak, diamondback rattlesnake, and the endangered Gila woodpecker. Home to the largest Sonoran Desert woodland in North America, trees in Milpitas Wash include mesquite, acacia, palo verde, and ironwood.

== See also ==
- List of U.S. Wilderness Areas
