= Hollow Hills Wilderness =

Wilderness area in California, United States

- IUCN category Ib (wilderness area)
- Location within California
- Location: San Bernardino County, California
- Nearest city: Baker, California
- Coordinates: 35.372°N 116.033°W
- Area: 22,366 acres (9,051 ha)
- Established: October 31, 1994
- Governing body: U.S. Bureau of Land Management

Hollow Hills Wilderness is a 22,366-acre wilderness area located near Baker, California in the Mohave Desert. The area is located within a large bajada that slopes downward toward Silver Lake, a dry lakebed. In the east, hills rise up toward the Turquoise Mountains. The vegetation consists of creosote bush scrub, desert holly, scale scrub, and desert wildflowers. Desert tortoise, Mohave fringe-toed lizard, and colorful birds like the vermilion flycatcher inhabit the desert landscape.

The land is managed by the Bureau of Land Management Barstow Field Office and was established as part of the California Desert Protection Act of 1994.
