= National Conservation Area =

Protected area managed by the US Bureau of Land Management

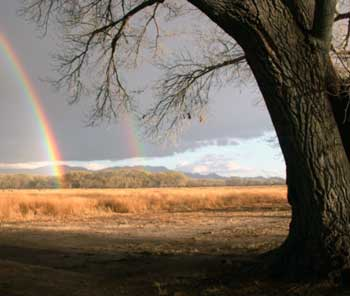
Double rainbow at San Pedro Riparian National Conservation Area, Arizona

National Conservation Area is a designation for certain protected areas in the United States. They are nature conservation areas managed by the Bureau of Land Management (BLM) under the National Conservation Lands.

Restrictions vary between these conservation areas, but generally they are not leased or sold under mining laws and motorized vehicle use is restricted, unlike many other BLM areas.

== National Conservation Areas ==
There are nineteen National Conservation Areas within the National Conservation Lands, they are:

Conservation Area	BLM Acres	State
Beaver Dam Wash National Conservation Area	68,083	Utah
Black Rock Desert – High Rock Canyon Emigrant Trails National Conservation Area	799,165	Nevada
Dominguez-Escalante National Conservation Area	209,610	Colorado
El Malpais National Conservation Area	339,100	New Mexico
Fort Stanton – Snowy River Cave National Conservation Area	24,950	New Mexico
Gila Box Riparian National Conservation Area	21,767	Arizona
Gunnison Gorge National Conservation Area	62,844	Colorado
John Wesley Powell National Conservation Area	29,868	Utah
King Range National Conservation Area	57,288	California
Las Cienegas National Conservation Area	35,280	Arizona
McInnis Canyons National Conservation Area	122,300	Colorado
Numanaa Nobe National Conservation Area	160,223	Nevada
Pistone-Black Mountain National Conservation Area	3,415	Nevada
Red Cliffs National Conservation Area	44,725	Utah
Red Rock Canyon National Conservation Area	195,819	Nevada
San Pedro Riparian National Conservation Area	55,495	Arizona
Sloan Canyon National Conservation Area	48,438	Nevada
Snake River Birds of Prey National Conservation Area	484,034	Idaho
Steese National Conservation Area	1,208,624	Alaska
