= Gila Box Riparian National Conservation Area =

Protected area

- IUCN category V (protected landscape/seascape)
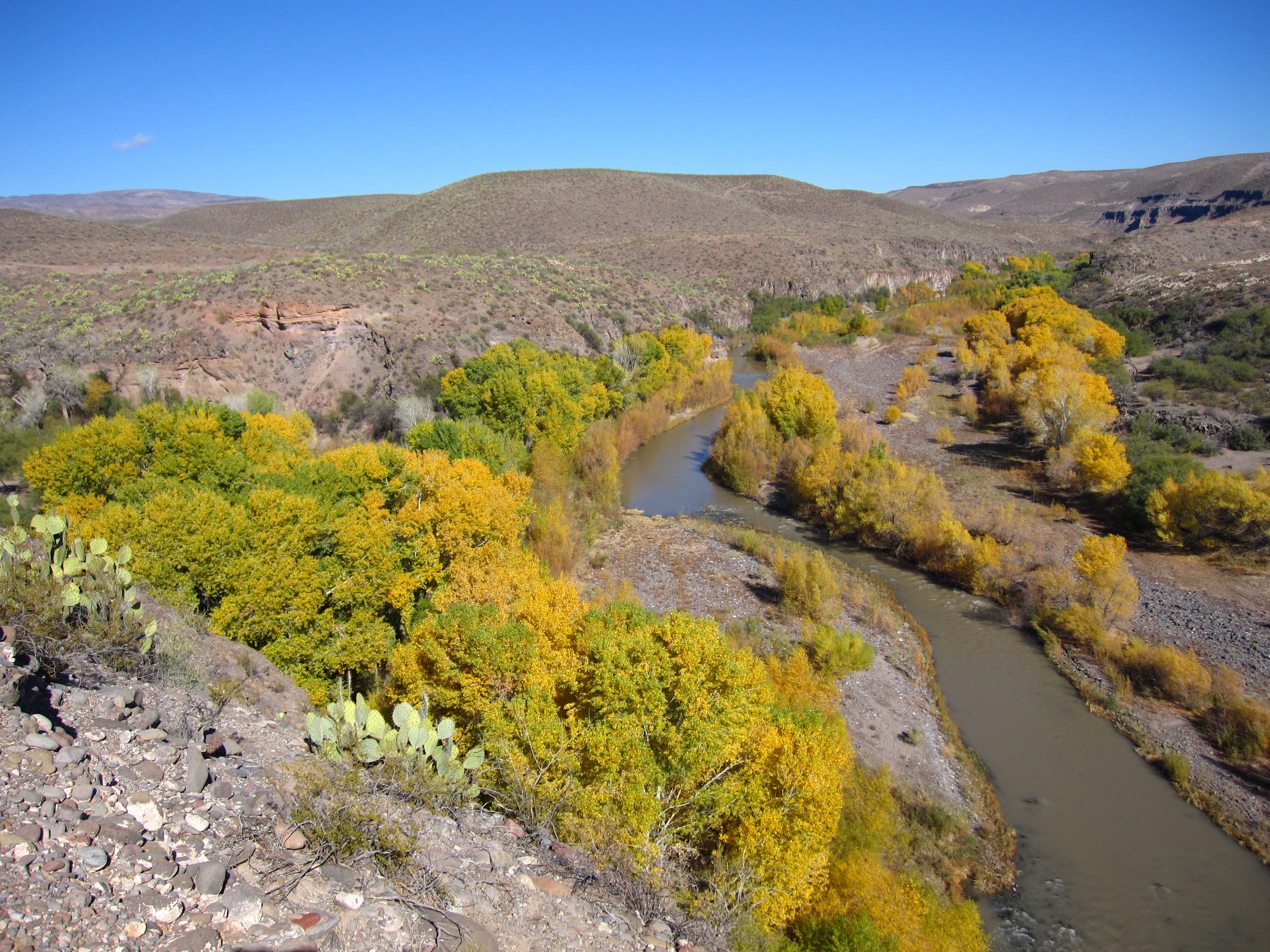
- Gila River in Gila Box

- Location within the United States Location within Arizona
- Location: Graham and Greenlee counties, Arizona, United States
- Nearest city: Safford, Arizona
- Coordinates: 32.922°N 109.484°W
- Area: 23,000 acres (93 km^{2})
- Established: 1990
- Governing body: Bureau of Land Management
- Website: www.blm.gov/az/st/en/prog/blm_special_areas/ncarea/gbox.html

Gila Box Riparian National Conservation Area is a National Conservation Area located along the Gila River in southern Graham and Greenlee counties in southeastern Arizona in the United States. Administered by the Bureau of Land Management, the conservation area is approximately 23,000 acres (93 km^{2}) in size. Campgrounds and hiking trails are available. The section of the Gila River that flows through the Gila Box is popular with white-water rafters and kayakers.

The Gila Box Riparian National Conservation Area is located 20 miles northeast of Safford, Arizona in Graham and Greenlee Counties.
