= Piper Mountain Wilderness =

Protected wilderness area in California, United States

- IUCN category Ib (wilderness area)
- Location within California Location within the United States
- Interactive map of Piper Mountain Wilderness
- Location: Inyo County, California
- Nearest city: Bishop, California
- Coordinates: 37°19′22″N 117°55′37″W
- Area: 72,575 acres (29,370 ha)
- Established: 1994
- Governing body: Department of the Interior / Bureau of Land Management

The Piper Mountain Wilderness is a federally designated wilderness area located in the White Mountains 20 miles (32 km) northeast of Big Pine, California in Inyo County, California.

The Wilderness Area was created by the 1994 California Desert Protection Act, and encompasses 72,575 acres (29,370 ha) of Great Basin wildlands, east of the Owens Valley and west of the Eureka Valley.

== Geography ==
There are three separate units of the wilderness, separated by vehicle corridors, with elevations from 3,430 feet (1,050 m) to 8,805 feet (2,684 m).

The landscape is characterized by steep mountains, narrow canyons, sloping alluvial fans and level floodplains. It includes a subrange of the Inyo Mountains called the Chocolate Mountains, a northwestern section of the Last Chance Range and the upper end of Eureka Valley which is immediately north of Death Valley National Park.

The highest peaks of the wilderness are in the Chocolate Mountains and include Mount Nunn (7,815 feet) and Lime Hill (6,532 feet). The wilderness's namesake Piper Mountain (labeled 'Chocolate Mountain' on topo maps) rises to an elevation of 7,546 feet (2,300 m).

=== Topography ===
The vehicle corridors that break the continuity of the Piper Wilderness Area into three parts were a concession made when the area was added to the California Desert Protection Act.

- The western section is the largest of the three and includes the east side, the steep west side and the crest of the Chocolate Mountains subrange.
- The central section is separated from the western portion by a road linking State Route 168 to Death Valley Road. A colorful and deeply dissected bahada rising to a subrange of the Last Chance Mountains characterize the central section.
- The third and smallest section of the wilderness is separated from the central portion by Loretto Mine Road and Horse Thief Canyon and is a continuation of the Last Chance subrange with its border being the Eureka Valley Road and Death Valley National Park.

== Flora and fauna ==
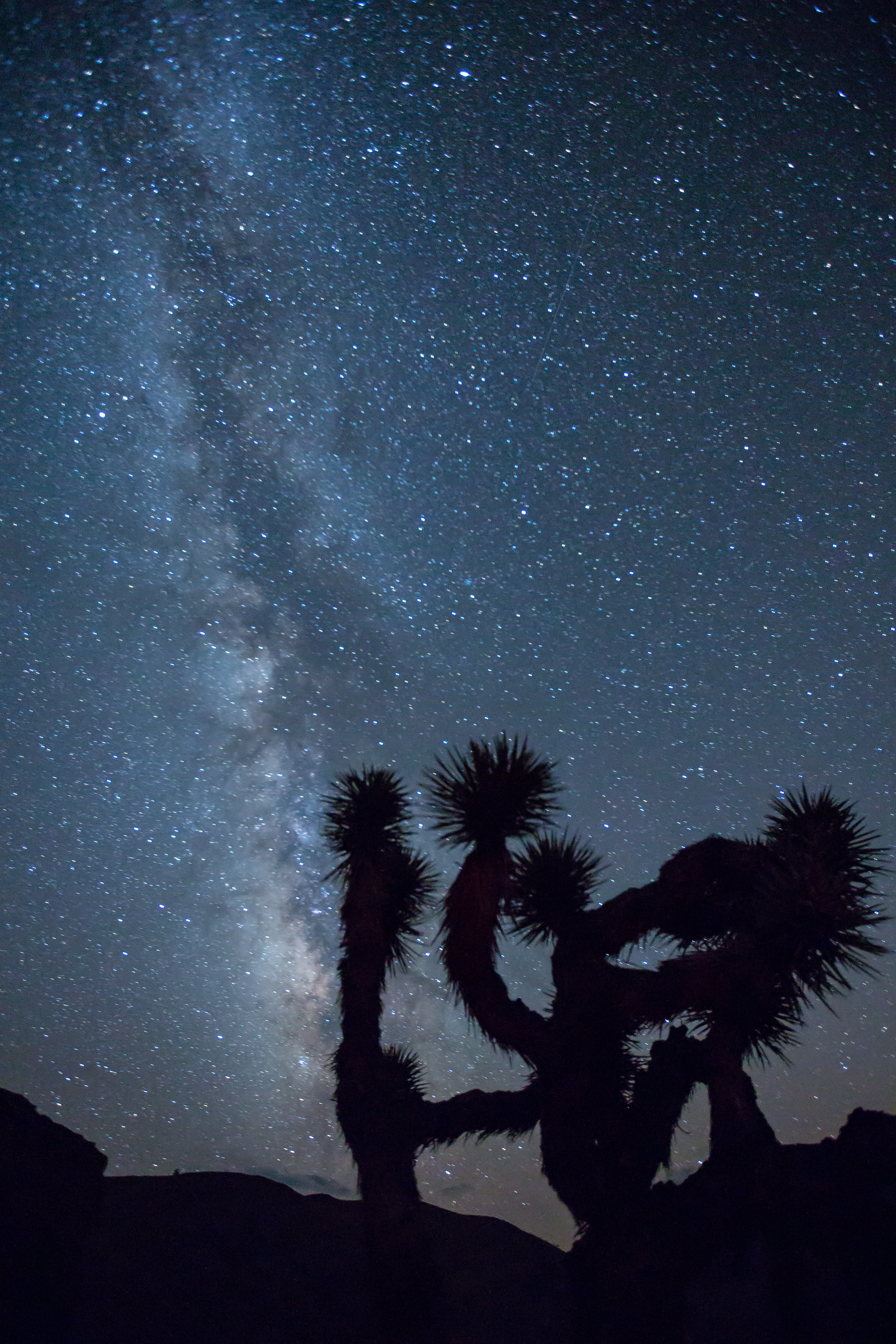
Piper Mountain Wilderness

Desert vegetation include xeric shrublands of Creosote bush (Larrea tridentata) in the lower valleys. Plants in the higher elevations include: Shadscale (Atriplex confertifolia), Littleleaf Horsebrush (Tetradymia axillaris), Stansbury cliffrose (Purshia stansburiana), Desert-olive (Forestiera pubescens) and Mormon tea (Ephedra californica) on . North-facing high elevation slopes are studded with Single-leaf Pinyon (Pinus monophylla) and California juniper (Juniperus californica).

Within the wilderness grows one of the northernmost stands of Joshua Tree (Yucca brevifolia), at the base of the Inyo Mountains.

Rare wildflowers include black milkvetch or Funeral Mountain milkvetch (Astragalus funereus), and the cactus Redspined fishhook cactus or Mojave fish hook cactus (Sclerocactus polyancistrus), which grows in Joshua tree "woodland" communities.

There are three areas within the wilderness that are habitat for the Desert Bighorn Sheep.

== Recreation ==
Recreational opportunities are day-hiking and backpacking with solitude almost guaranteed as the wilderness is very lightly used. The Bureau of Land Management oversees the Piper Wilderness and does not require any permits for visitors. Because the Piper Mountain Wilderness Area received federal protection so recently, the 19 miles (31 km) of trail are actually closed four-wheel drive roads.

=== Water and recreation ===
Water is the single most limiting factor when exploring this desert wilderness. Caching water is possible in many locations because of the road corridors through the area. The majority of visitors are students from Deep Springs College in Deep Springs Valley, located between highway 168 and the western edge of the wilderness.

Most often hiked is the deep notch of the Soldier Pass Canyon which extends east to west in the Chocolate Mountains. Maps dating to 1879 show a "Soldier Pass" label. The eastern face of the Chocolate Mountains rise 2,000 feet (610 m) above the canyon mouth with the canyon narrowing as it rises in elevation. The broad saddle of Soldier Pass is gained after 3.2 miles (5.1 km) and is at an elevation of 5,500 feet (1,700 m).

The Bureau of Land Management (BLM) encourages the practice of Leave No Trace principles of wilderness travel to help protect the fragile desert environment.

== See also ==
- Eureka Valley Sand Dunes
- Great Basin Desert
- Category: Protected areas of the Mojave Desert
- Category: Flora of the California desert regions
- Environmental ethics
