= Great Falls Basin Wilderness =

Protected area in California, United States

- Location within California Location within the United States
- Location: Inyo County, California, USA
- Nearest city: Ridgecrest, CA
- Coordinates: 35°51′13″N 117°23′23″W
- Area: 7,810 acres (31.6 km^{2})
- Established: 2019
- Governing body: Bureau of Land Management

The Great Falls Basin Wilderness is a 7,810-acre (31.6 km^{2}) acre wilderness in the Argus Range in the Death Valley region of California, United States. It was established in 2019 by the John D. Dingell Jr. Conservation, Management, and Recreation Act.

A perennial spring has cut through the rocks in the area, creating a slot canyon and the falls which give the area its name.

The western edge of the area abuts Naval Air Weapons Station China Lake, and to the south, Indian Joe Springs Ecological Reserve is nearly-enclaved by the wilderness. Homewood Canyon lies immediately north.

== Flora and Fauna ==
At lower elevations, the plant life is desert scrub, and at higher points, upland scrub consisting of yucca, mountain mahogany, pinyon, and juniper trees is found. The rare canyon Towhee frequents the area, as well as desert bighorn sheep.

== See also ==
- List of U.S. Wilderness Areas
