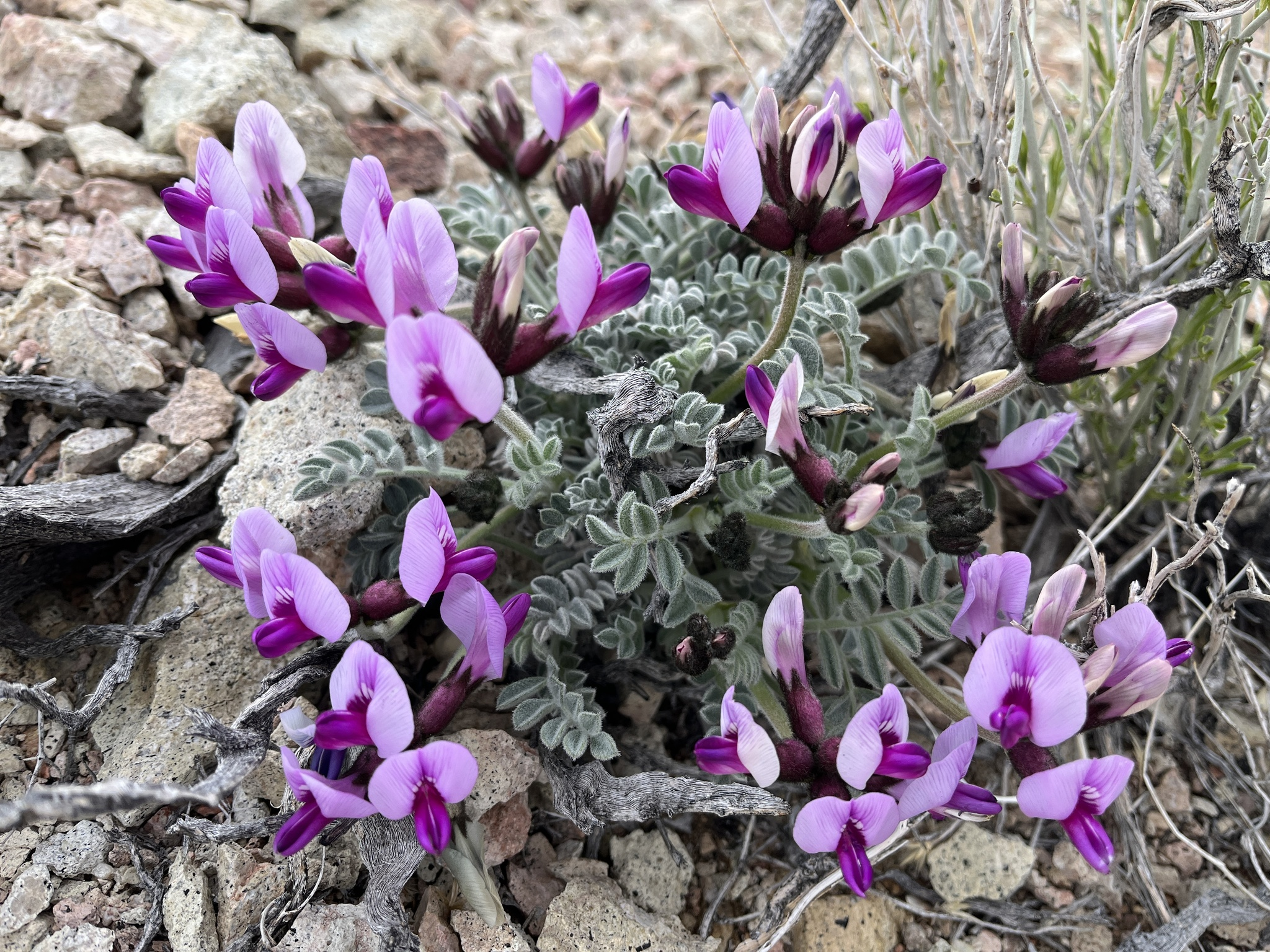

Conservation status
- Imperiled (NatureServe)

Scientific classification
- Kingdom: Plantae
- Clade: Embryophytes
- Clade: Tracheophytes
- Clade: Angiosperms
- Clade: Eudicots
- Clade: Rosids
- Order: Fabales
- Family: Fabaceae
- Subfamily: Faboideae
- Genus: Astragalus
- Species: A. funereus

Binomial name
- Astragalus funereus M.E.Jones

= Astragalus funereus =

Species of legume

Astragalus funereus is an uncommon species of milkvetch known by the common names Funeral Mountain milkvetch and black milkvetch.

The Latin name funereus and common name "Funeral Mountain milkvetch" refers to a population in the Funeral Mountains of Death Valley in California.

It is native to the Mojave Desert scrub of eastern California and western Nevada.

== Description ==
Astragalus funereus is a small tufted perennial herb coated densely in stiff hairs. The stems are up to 8 centimeters long. The short leaves are made up of several hairy oval-shaped leaflets growing close together. The inflorescence contains up to 10 flowers and is covered in black hairs. The flowers are 2 to 3 centimeters long and pink and purple streaked. The fruit is a compressed, lance-shaped legume pod up to 5 centimeters long. It is leathery and coated in white hairs.
