= Gunnison Gorge Wilderness =

American wilderness area

- IUCN category Ib (wilderness area)
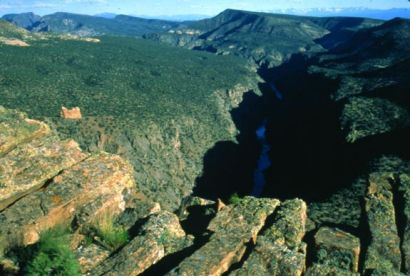

- Location within the United States
- Location: Montrose / Delta counties, Colorado, USA
- Nearest city: Montrose, CO
- Coordinates: 38°40′00″N 107°50′00″W
- Area: 17,784 acres (71.97 km^{2})
- Established: 1999
- Governing body: Bureau of Land Management

The Gunnison Gorge Wilderness is a U.S. Wilderness Area located immediately northwest of the Black Canyon of the Gunnison National Park, in Colorado. The 17,784-acre (71.97 km^{2}) wilderness area established in 1999 includes 14 miles (23 km) of the Gunnison River inside the Gunnison Gorge National Conservation Area.
