= Gunnison Gorge National Conservation Area =

National Conservation Area in Colorado, US

- IUCN category V (protected landscape/seascape)
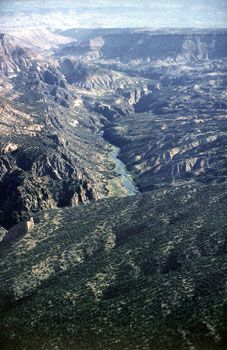
- Aerial View of Ute Park, GGNCA

- Location within the United States Location within Colorado
- Location: Delta County / Montrose County, Colorado, USA
- Nearest city: Montrose, Colorado
- Coordinates: 38.622°N 107.889°W
- Area: 62,844 acres (254.32 km^{2})
- Established: 1999
- Governing body: Bureau of Land Management
- Website: www.blm.gov/co/st/en/nca/ggnca.html

The Gunnison Gorge National Conservation Area is a 62,844-acre (254.32 km^{2}) National Conservation Area located in west-central Colorado near Montrose. It is managed by the Bureau of Land Management (BLM) as part of the National Landscape Conservation System. 57,725 acres (233.60 km^{2}) were designated in the Black Canyon of the Gunnison National Park and Gunnison Gorge National Conservation Area Act of 1999 (Public Law 106-76). The Black Canyon of the Gunnison Boundary Revision Act of 2003 (Public Law 108-78) expanded the NCA to its current size.
