= Palo Verde Mountains =

Landform in Imperial County, California

- Location within California

Highest point
- Elevation: 285 m (935 ft)

Geography
- Country: United States
- State: California
- District: Imperial County
- Range coordinates: 33°21′3.113″N 114°49′43.865″W
- Topo map: USGS Palo Verde Peak

The Palo Verde Mountains are a mountain range in northeastern Imperial County, California. They are located along the west side of the Colorado River in the Lower Colorado River Valley and Colorado Desert. Palo Verde Peak, which rises to about 1,800 feet in the southern portion, is the highest point in the area. Thumb Peak stands to the north. Clapp Spring, a palm oasis, is located east of Thumb Peak. Clapp Spring is the only permanent water source in the area for wildlife species.
