= Blackridge Wilderness =

Protected area in Utah, United States

- IUCN category Ib (wilderness area)
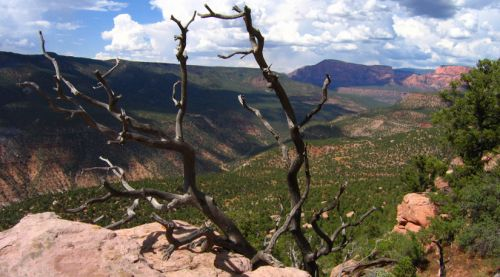
- Blackridge Wilderness

- Location within the United States
- Location: Washington County, Utah, USA
- Nearest city: Cedar City, UT
- Coordinates: 37.3392213055°N 113.225425663°W
- Area: 13,108 acres (5,305 ha)
- Established: March 30, 2009
- Governing body: Bureau of Land Management

Blackridge Wilderness is a 13,108-acre (5,305 ha) wilderness area in the state of Utah. It was designated March 30, 2009, as part of the Omnibus Public Land Management Act of 2009. Located adjacent to the Kolob Canyons section of Zion National Park, it protects a Black Ridge, formed by the Hurricane Fault, as well as a long stretch of LaVerkin Creek, a tributary of the Wild and Scenic Virgin River. Blackridge Wilderness is bordered by the Zion Wilderness to the northeast.

== Flora and fauna ==
Ecosystems in the Blackridge Wilderness range from low desert at the bottom of LaVerkin Creek, through pinyon-juniper woodlands in the middle elevations, and ponderosa pine, Douglas fir, and aspen forests at the highest elevations. Hanging gardens grow on some canyon walls. The wilderness and creek also offer habitat for mountain lion, mule deer, many species of raptor, and numerous small animals.

== See also ==
- List of U.S. Wilderness Areas
- Wilderness Act
