= McInnis Canyons National Conservation Area =

National Conservation Area

- IUCN category V (protected landscape/seascape)
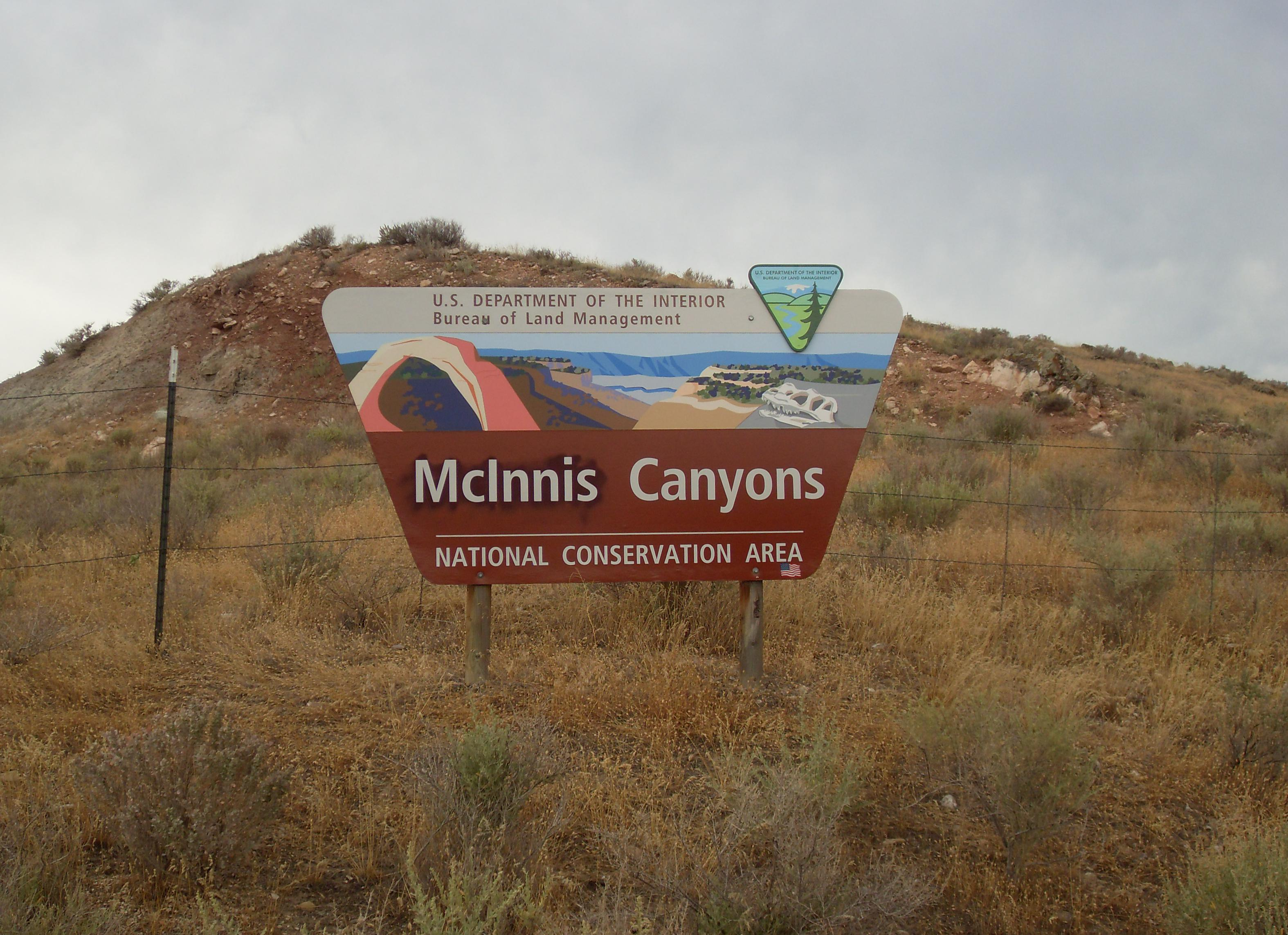
- McInnis Canyons National Conservation Area sign close to Grand Junction

- Location within the United States
- Location: Mesa County, Colorado / Grand County, Utah, USA
- Nearest city: Grand Junction
- Coordinates: 39°06′19″N 108°55′50″W
- Area: 123,400 acres (499 km^{2})
- Established: 2000
- Governing body: U.S. Bureau of Land Management
- Website: www.blm.gov/co/st/en/nca/mcnca.html

The McInnis Canyons National Conservation Area (MCNCA) is a 123,400-acre (499 km^{2}) National Conservation Area located in Mesa County, west of Grand Junction, Colorado. The MCNCA has rugged sandstone canyons, natural arches, spires, and alcoves carved into the Colorado Plateau, through which runs a 24-mile (39 km) stretch of the Colorado River. Included in the MCNCA is the 75,500-acre (306 km^{2}) Black Ridge Canyons Wilderness (BRCW) with 5,200 acres (21 km^{2}) extending into eastern Grand County, Utah at the MCNCA's western boundary.

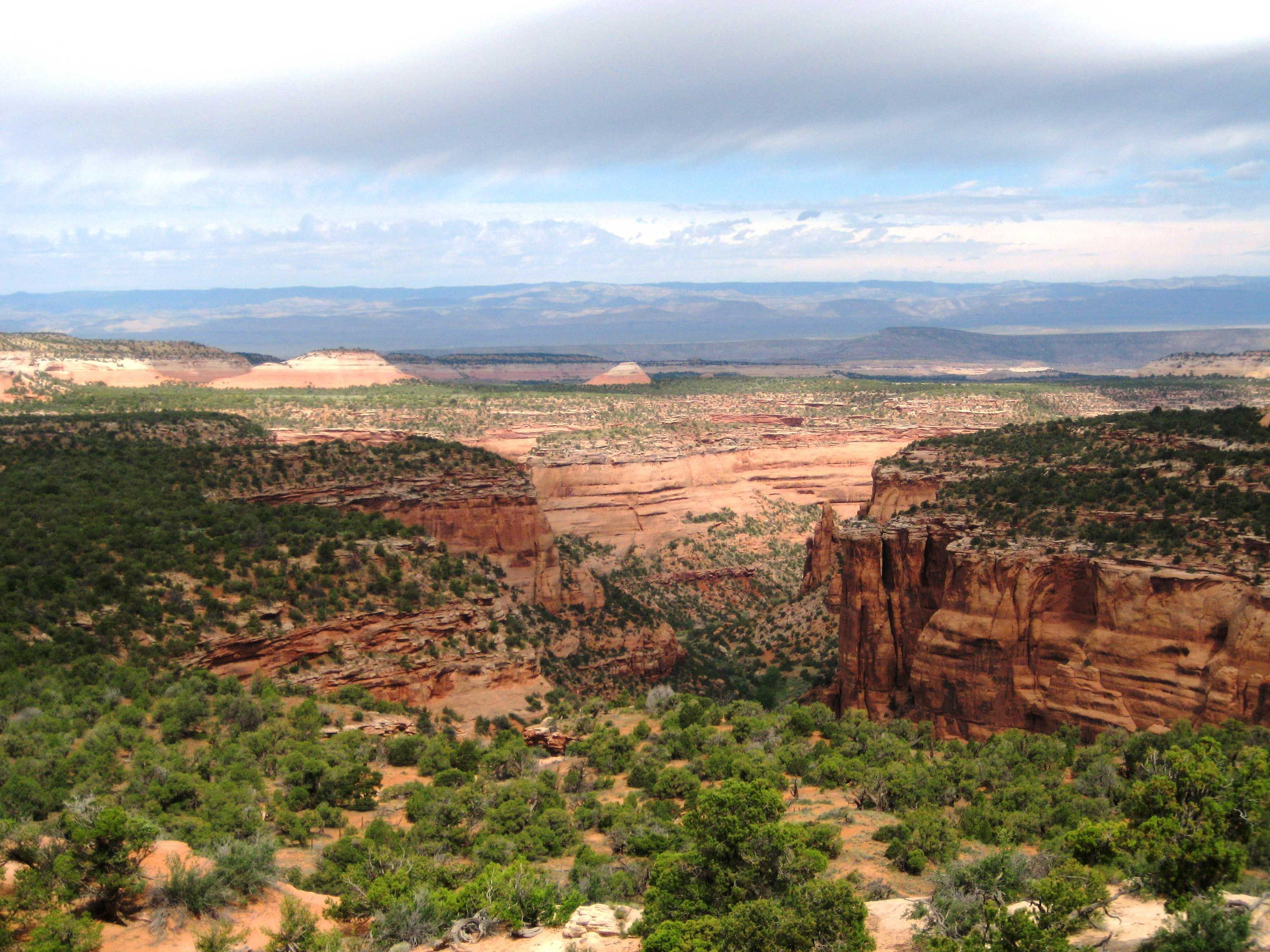
Knowles Canyon, Black Ridge Canyons Wilderness, MCNCA

The MCNCA is managed by the Bureau of Land Management as part of the National Landscape Conservation System, and was officially designated on October 24, 2000, when the Colorado Canyons National Conservation Area and Black Ridge Canyons Wilderness Act of 2000 became Public Law 106-353. The NCA was renamed after Congressman Scott McInnis on January 1, 2005.

McInnis Canyons NCA has a variety of resources and recreation opportunities resulting in users with diverse interests, including hiking, biking, float boating, off-highway vehicle (OHV) use, horseback riding, hunting, wildlife watching, backpacking, camping, and grazing resources; as well as geological, paleontological and scientific sites.

McInnis Canyons NCA is also home to the Rattlesnake Arches. This area houses the highest concentration of naturally occurring arches in Colorado, and even the second most in the world, behind Arches National Park. It is located in the Black Ridge Canyons Wilderness and comprises sandstone formations, and is not able to be reached by vehicle.

== Management ==
McInnis Canyons is located within the Bureau of Land Management's Grand Junction Field Office. A Resource Management Plan (RMP) was written and approved for the NCA in 2004. Four alternatives were proposed and open to public review. The BLM's preferred alternative, adaptive management, was approved and enacted under the RMP. The plan states:

this alternative's emphasis is on maintaining the current level of experience and enjoyment of the area's recreational opportunities and unique characteristics while recognizing that increased future use would trigger the need for increased levels of management. Monitoring for land health and visitors' experiences would determine when adjustments to management would be required. Objectives for this alternative include preserving the character of the area and enhancing traditional recreation, while maintaining land health and improving priority areas of concern.

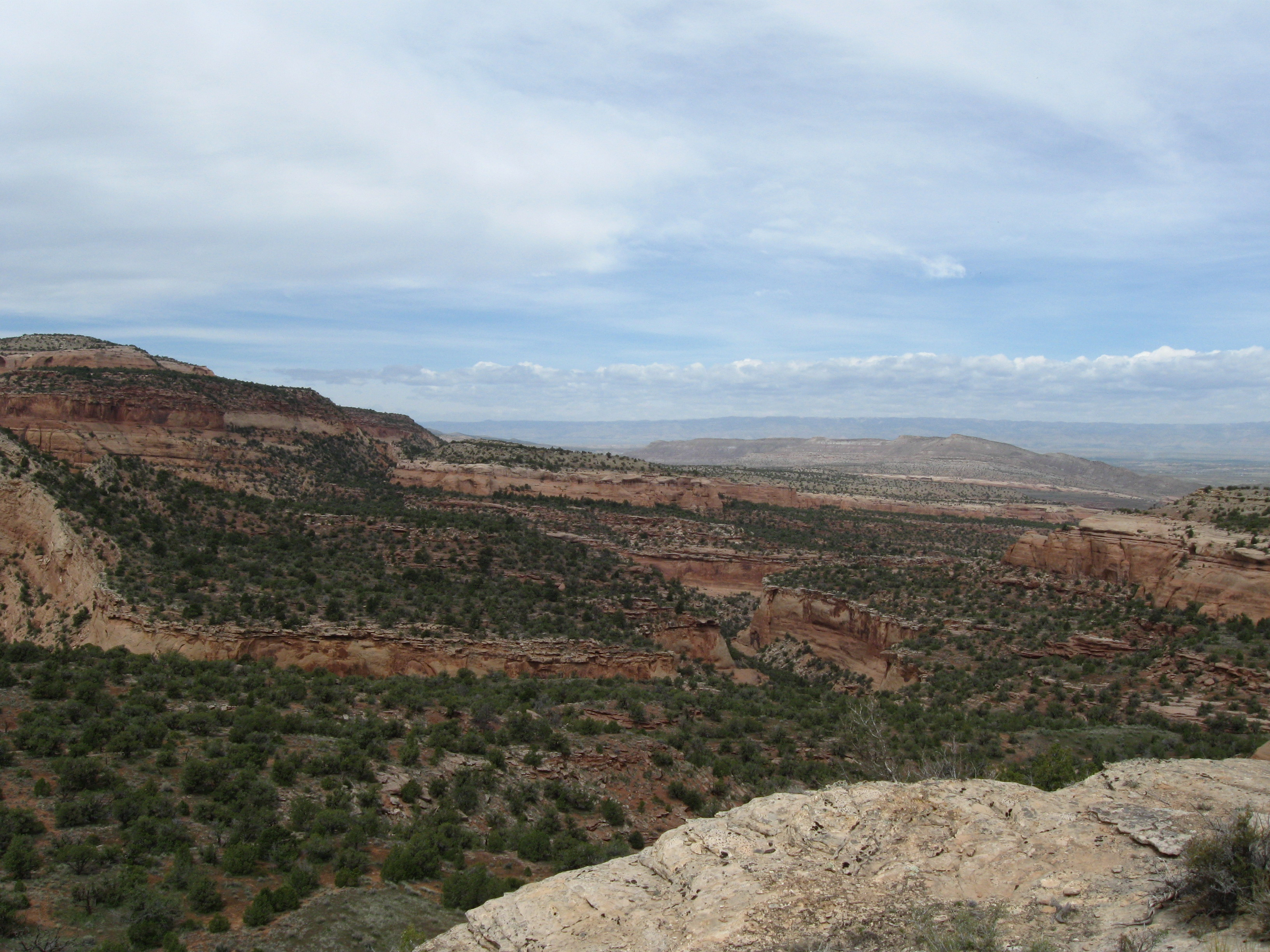
Pollock Canyon from south, MCNCA
