= Floyd Lounsbury =

American linguist and anthropologist

- Born: April 25, 1914; Stevens Point, Wisconsin, U.S.
- Died: May 14, 1998 (aged 84); Branford, Connecticut, U.S.
- Spouse: Masako Yokoyama (m. 1952)
- Children: 1 (Ruth)

Academic background
- Education: Yale University
- Thesis: Oneida Verb Morphology (1949)
- Doctoral advisor: Bernard Bloch

Academic work
- Discipline: Indigenous linguistics
- Institutions: Yale University
- Doctoral students: § Notable students

Floyd Glenn Lounsbury (April 25, 1914 – May 14, 1998) was an American linguist, anthropologist and Mayanist scholar and epigrapher, best known for his work on linguistic and cultural systems of a variety of North and South American languages. Equally important were his contributions to understanding the hieroglyphs, culture and history of the Maya civilization of pre-Columbian Mesoamerica.

== Early life and education ==
Lounsbury was born in Stevens Point, Wisconsin to John Glenn Lounsbury and Anna Louise Jorgensen. He was one of three children, along with a brother, Gordon, and a sister, Elva.

He graduated from the University of Wisconsin–Madison in 1941, majoring in mathematics. During his undergraduate studies, Morris Swadesh was on the faculty, lecturing on American Indian linguistics. Lounsbury audited his courses, and when Swadesh received grants from the Works Progress Administration for a study of Oneida language and folklore, he appointed Lounsbury as his assistant. When Swadesh left Wisconsin for Mexico City, Lounsbury took over as the director of the project. He created an orthography for the language, and taught it to students who gathered a variety of texts from Oneida language speakers. After the project, Lounsbury began work in 1940 on the phonology of the language for his master's degree at the university.

== Career ==
When World War II broke out, he enrolled as a meteorologist in the XXII Weather Squadron, US Army Air Corps. Stationed in Brazil, he learned Portuguese there. He received his master's degree in 1946. Awarded a fellowship by the Rockefeller Foundation, he worked on Oneida verb morphology in the department of anthropology at Yale. He received his Ph.D. from Yale in 1949 (his chair was Bernard Bloch), and his dissertation formed the basis of a 1953 publication (Oneida Verb Morphology) that established a framework and terminology followed ever since in the analysis of Iroquoian languages.

He joined the Yale department of anthropology in 1949, and taught there until his retirement in 1979. Upon his retirement, he was appointed Sterling Professor Emeritus of Anthropology, a post he held until his death at age 84.

== Contributions ==
He traced the historical relationship between various Iroquoian languages, and as part of his work for the New York Vermont Interstate Commission on the Lake Champlain Basin, wrote an authoritative study of Iroquois place names in the Champlain Valley (Lounsbury 1960). He initiated the application of linguistic methods to the formal analysis of kinship terminology and social organization. He also recorded the Oneida creation myth in 1971 in Ontario, which was to result in a book, published posthumously (in 2000) by his student Bryan Gick, that included the creation myth and references to versions translated earlier, and linguistic analysis of various aspects of Iroquoian stories.

His linguistics work also had a bearing on his anthropological studies – he used his knowledge of semantic fields to relate kin type to phones in the field of phonetics (Lounsbury 1956).

Lounsbury was an early proponent of Yuri Knorozov's phonetic theory on the Maya hieroglyphs, namely that they were syllables rather than ideograms. He contributed to the methodology that ultimately led to the deciphering of the hieroglyphs. He was part of the trio with Linda Schele and Peter Mathews that, in one afternoon in 1973, worked out a 200-year timeline of the Palenque royal family, presenting it that evening at the first Palenque Round Table. During this period, Lounsbury studied the Venus almanac in the Dresden Codex and concluded that the original Goodman correlation fits the evidence in the codex better than the standard Goodman–Martinez–Thompson correlation. A correlation constant is the number of days between the start of the Julian Period (January 1, 4713 BCE) and the era date of the Long Count of 13.0.0.0.0 4 Ajaw 8 Kumk'u. It is used to convert between the Long Count and western calendars. The Goodman correlation constant is 584,285, two days more than the standard GMT correlation of 584,283.

== Personal life ==
Lounsbury married fellow linguist Masako Yokoyama in 1952. The novelist and film-maker Ruth Ozeki is their daughter.

He lived in East Haven, Connecticut, and died of congestive heart failure at Connecticut Hospice.

== Appointments and awards ==
- Fellow of the Center for Advanced Study in Behavioural Sciences, Stanford, 1963–64
- Elected to National Academy of Sciences, 1969
- Cornplanter Medal, 1971
- Awarded the Wilbur Cross Medal by the Yale Graduate School of Arts and Sciences, 1971
- Senior Research Scholar, Dumbarton Oaks, Washington D.C., 1973–74 and 1977–78
- Elected to American Academy of Arts and Sciences, 1976
- Appointed the Sterling Professor Emeritus of Anthropology by the Yale University, 1979
- Elected to American Philosophical Society, 1987
- Awarded an honorary doctorate by the University of Pennsylvania, 1987
- Delivered the Distinguished Lecture at the American Anthropological Association Annual Meeting, 1990

== Notable students ==
- Marianne Mithun
- Wallace Chafe
- William C. Sturtevant
- Hanni Woodbury
- Harold Conklin
- Peter Mathews
- Bryan Gick
- Stephen Houston

== Bibliography ==
- Phonology of the Oneida Language MA Thesis, University of Wisconsin, 1946
- Stray Number Systems among Certain Indian Tribes American Anthropologist XLVIII, 1948
- Oneida Verb Morphology Yale University Press, 1953
- The Method of Descriptive Morphology in Readings in Linguistics ed. E P Hamp, M Joos, F W Householder and R Austerlitz, University of Chicago Press, 1953
- A Semantic Analysis of Pawnee Kinship Usage Language XXXII, 1956
- Iroquois Place-Names in the Champlain Valley University of the State of New York, Albany, 1960
- Iroquois-Cherokee Linguistic Relations Bureau of American Ethnology Bulletin CLXXX, 1961
- A Formal Account of the Crow- and Omaha- type Kinship Terminologies in Explorations in Cultural Anthropology, ed. W Goodenough, McGraw-Hill, 1964
- Another View of the Trobriand Kinship Categories in Formal Semantic Analysis, ed. E Hammel, American Anthropological Association, 1965
- A Study in Structural Semantics: The Sirionó Kinship System with Harold W. Scheffler. Prentice-Hall, 1971
- On the Derivation and Reading of the "Ben-Ich" Affix in Mesoamerican Writing Systems, 1973
- Pacal in First Palenque Round Table, ed. M G Robertson, Pre-Columbian Art Research, 1974
- A Rationale for the Initial Date of the Temple of the Cross at Palenque in The Art, Iconography and Dynastic History of Palenque, ed. M G Robertson, Pre-Columbian Art Research Institute, 1976
- Parentage Expressions in Classic Maya Inscriptions with L Schele and P Mathews, International Conference on Maya Iconography and Hieroglyphic Writing Guatemala City, 1977
- Maya Numeration, Computation, and Calendrical Astronomy in Dictionary of Scientific Biography XV, ed. C C Gillespie, Scribners, 1978
- A Solution for the Number 1.5.5.0, in The Sky in Mayan Literature, edited by A. Aveni, Oxford U, Press, 1992.
- Some Problems in the Interpretation of the Mythological Portion of the Hieroglyphic Text of the Temple of the Cross at Palenque in Third Palenque Round Table, ed. M G Robertson, 1978
- Astronomical Knowledge and Its Uses at Bonampak, Mexico in Archaeoastronomy in the New World : American Primitive Astronomy, ed. A F Aveni, Cambridge University Press, 1982
- Glyphic Substitutions: Homophonic and Synonymic in Phoneticism in Mayan Hieroglyphic Writing, ed. J S Justeson and L Campbell, Institute for Mesoamerican Studies, State University of New York at Albany, 1984
- The Identities of the Mythological Figures in the Cross Group Inscriptions of Palenque in Fourth Palenque Round Table, ed. M G Robertson and E P Benson, Pre-Columbian Art Research Institute, 1985
- The Ancient Writing of Middle America in The Origins of Writing, ed. W Senner, University of Nebraska Press, 1989
- A Palenque King and the Planet Jupiter in World Archaeastronomy, ed. A F Aveni, Cambridge University Press, 1989
- Recent Work in the Decipherment of Palenque's Hieroglyphic Inscriptions American Anthropologist XCIII, 1991
- "A Solution for the Number 1.5.5.0 of the Mayan Venus Table", and "A Derivation of the Mayan to Julian Correlation from the Dresden Codex, Venus Chronology", chapters in "The Sky in Mayan Literature", edited by Anthony F. Aveni, Oxford University Press, 1992.
- The Oneida Creation Story by Demus Elm and Harvey Antone, Translated and edited by Lounsbury and Bryan Gick, 2000
