= Chappell Roan =

American singer and songwriter (born 1998)

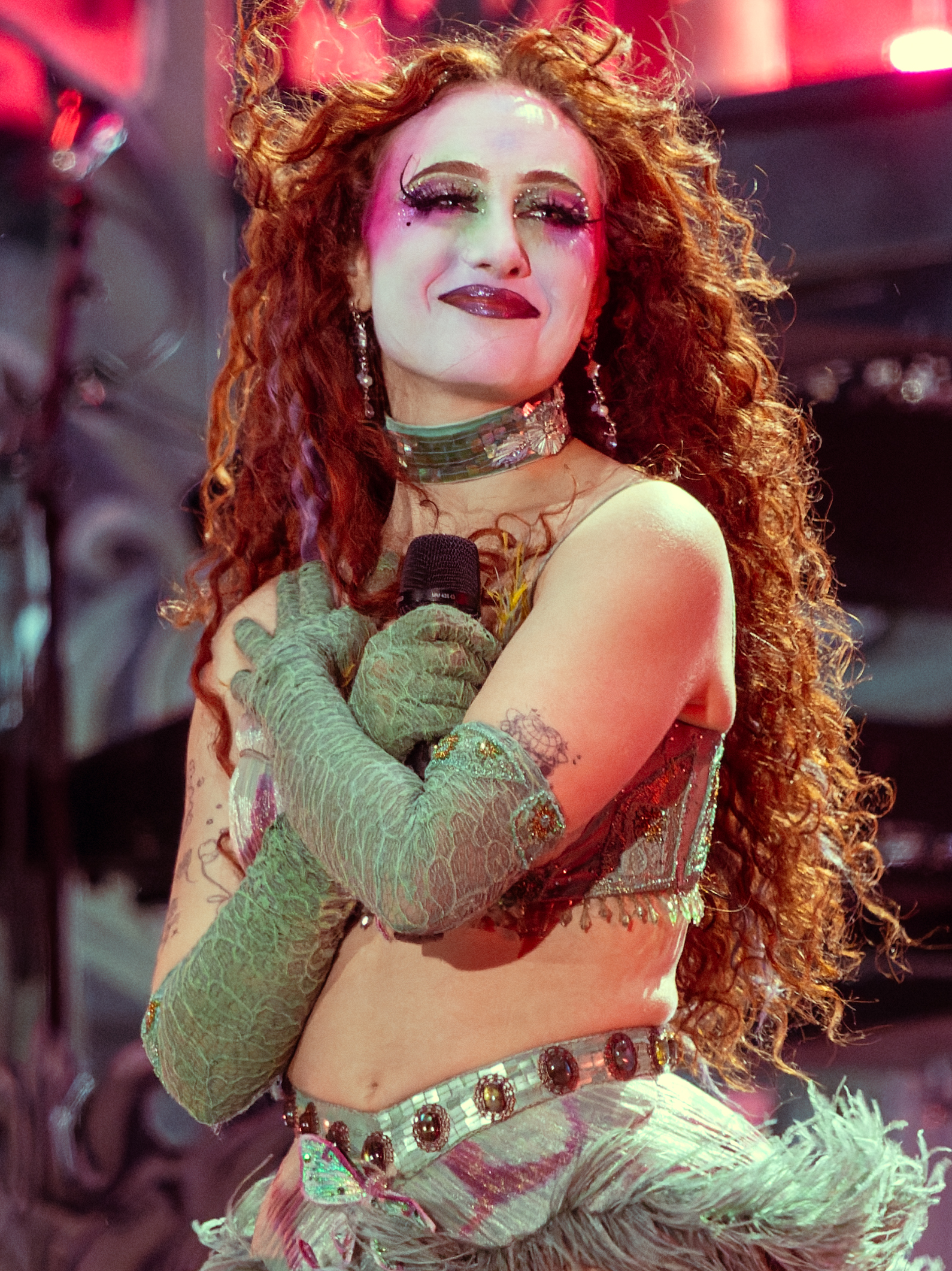
- Roan performing in 2025
- Born: Kayleigh Rose Amstutz; February 19, 1998 (age 28); Willard, Missouri, U.S.
- Occupations: Singer; songwriter
- Musical career
- Genre: Pop
- Instruments: Vocals; piano
- Works: Discography
- Years active: 2014–present
- Labels: Atlantic; Amusement; Island
- Website: iamchappellroan.com

Kayleigh Rose Amstutz (born February 19, 1998), known professionally as Chappell Roan (/ˌtʃæpəl ˈroʊn/ CHAP-əl ROHN), is an American singer and songwriter. She is known for her camp and drag queen-influenced style.

After signing to Amusement Records—in partnership with Island Records—in 2023, Roan released her debut studio album, The Rise and Fall of a Midwest Princess. The next year, Roan achieved global recognition with the single "Good Luck, Babe!", which reached number four on the US Billboard Hot 100 and became an international top-five single. The song's popularity led to a resurgence of her debut album, which became a sleeper hit and peaked at number two on the US Billboard 200. It yielded the RIAA multi-platinum single "Hot to Go!", while her 2020 single, "Pink Pony Club", reached number one on the UK singles chart. In 2025, Roan won the Grammy Award for Best New Artist and earned her second UK number-one single with "The Subway".

== Early life ==
Kayleigh Rose Amstutz was born on February 19, 1998, in Willard, Missouri, the oldest of four children. Her mother, Kara (née Chappell), is a veterinarian; her father, Dwight Amstutz, is a retired Naval Reservist who also managed the family's veterinary practice in Springfield, and previously trained as a registered nurse, working in neurological and burn intensive care units. Her uncle is Darin Chappell, a Republican member of the Missouri House of Representatives.

Roan has described her hometown and upbringing as conservative and Christian. During her childhood, she attended church three times a week and spent several summers at Christian camps. In a 2023 Variety interview, she said she struggled with her upbringing and often snuck out, explaining: "I just wanted to feel like a good person, but I had this part of me that wanted to escape so bad."

Roan began playing piano when she was ten or eleven years old and started taking lessons at the age of twelve. She performed publicly for the first time at the age of thirteen, singing "The Christmas Song" at her school's talent show, which she won. When she was about fourteen, she auditioned for America's Got Talent without success. At fourteen or fifteen, she began uploading cover songs to YouTube, drawing attention from several record labels. She also began writing her own songs as she entered her teenage years, uploading those to YouTube as well. Alongside her online presence, she performed around her hometown and in Springfield from 2012 to 2015. She graduated a year early from Willard High School. Roan has said she missed many typical childhood experiences during the "messy" early years of her music career, including her prom and high school graduation.

== Career ==
=== 2014–2022: Career beginnings ===
In November 2014, Roan uploaded her original song "Die Young" to YouTube under the name Kayleigh Rose. She wrote the song while attending summer camp at the Interlochen Center for the Arts, which she said "changed my trajectory forever". She later traveled to New York for several musical showcases, leading to her signing with Atlantic Records in May 2015. In 2016, she adopted the stage name Chappell Roan in honor of her grandfather, Dennis K. Chappell, who died of brain cancer that same year. The name combines her grandfather's surname with a word taken from his favorite song, "The Strawberry Roan" by Curley Fletcher. She has also expressed dislike for her birth name.

On August 3, 2017, Roan released her first single, "Good Hurt". Interview reviewed the song favorably, praising her "striking maturity and surprisingly deep vocals". On September 22, 2017, she released her debut extended play (EP), School Nights, through Atlantic. Also in 2017, she supported Vance Joy on his Lay It On Me Tour. During this period, Roan lived with her parents in Springfield, flying with them to Los Angeles or New York City when needed. In 2018, she moved to Los Angeles. She has since said this was the first time she felt able to live openly as a queer woman, and that she felt "overwhelmed with complete love and acceptance", which allowed her to begin "writing songs as the real [her]". From January to March 2018, she toured the United States with Declan McKenna.

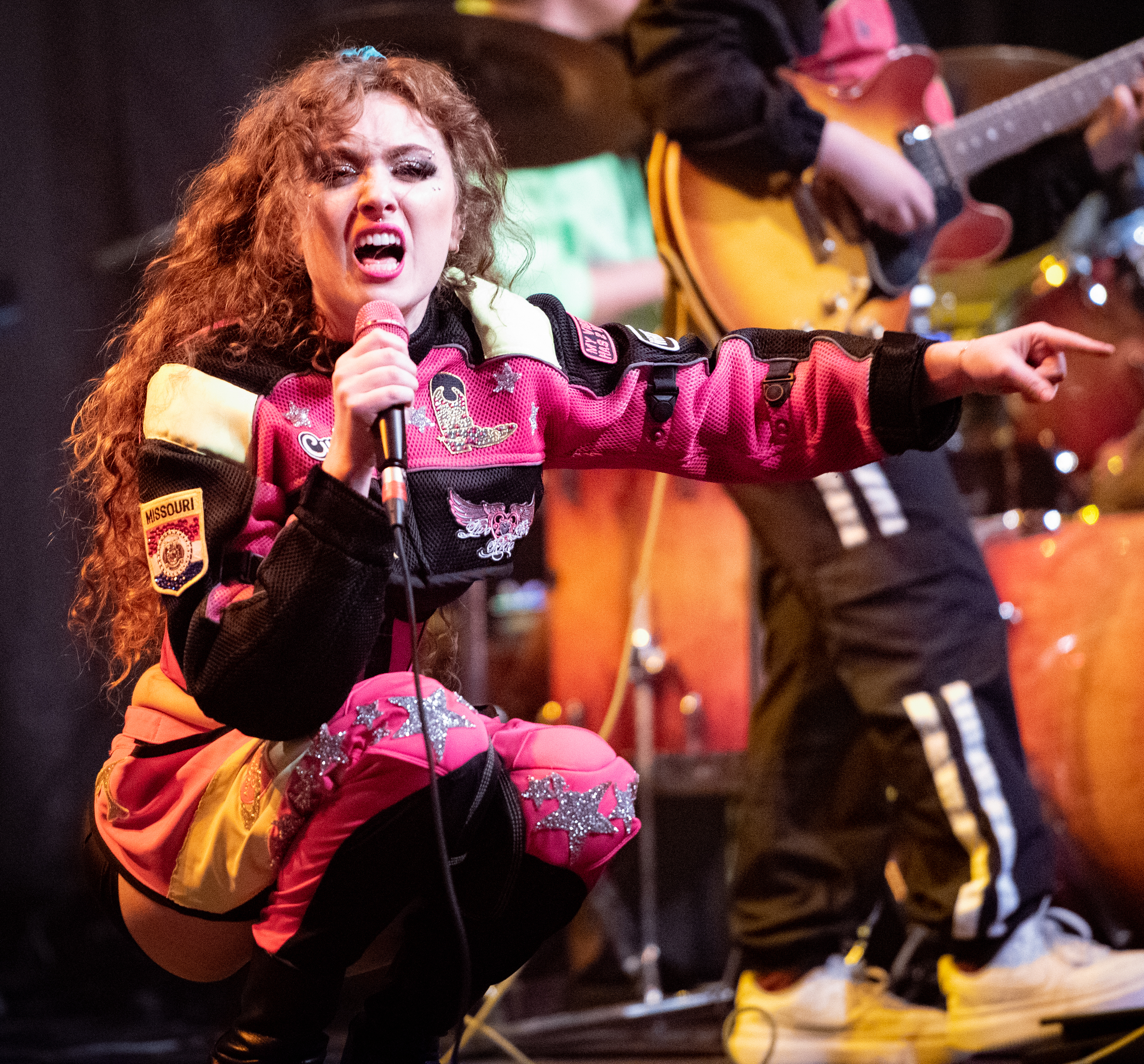
Roan performing at the Vogue Theatre in 2022

Roan began working with songwriter and producer Dan Nigro in late 2018. In April 2020, she released "Pink Pony Club", which she described as a "hard left turn" from School Nights. The single was produced by Nigro, and its music video was directed by Griffin Stoddard. Roan said the track expressed her desire to become a go-go dancer in Los Angeles, stating, "truthfully, I'm not confident enough to do that, so I wrote a song about it."

She released two additional singles, "Love Me Anyway" and "California", in May 2020. However, her releases were not profitable enough for Atlantic, which dropped her from the label in August 2020. Shortly afterward, Roan returned to Los Angeles in October 2020 to continue working on her music independently while holding a series of odd jobs, including as a production assistant and at a donut shop. That December, USA Today ranked "Pink Pony Club" third on its list of the "10 best songs of 2020", describing it as dance-pop that "earnestly [celebrates] queer culture, acceptance and chasing your dreams". A year after its release, Vulture called "Pink Pony Club" the "Song of Summer 2021", describing it as a "synthy infectious bangarang". By August 2022, the song had been streamed more than 10 million times on Spotify. In early 2021, the success of Olivia Rodrigo's "Drivers License" shifted Nigro's focus away from Roan as he worked on Sour with Rodrigo. Roan was unable to find another collaborator she liked as much. She briefly moved back to Missouri and worked at a drive-through while continuing to write music independently.

By March 2022, Roan had signed a publishing deal with Sony and reunited with Nigro to create and release "Naked in Manhattan", her first release as an independent artist. NPR described the song as a "queer girl bop" with lyrics that are "tender, nostalgic" and "flirty yet uncertain". While working with Nigro in a studio adjacent to Olivia Rodrigo, Roan recorded backing vocals on three of Rodrigo's songs, including "Can't Catch Me Now". Roan was selected as an opening act on Rodrigo's Sour Tour and for Fletcher on her Girl of My Dreams Tour.

In August 2022, she released her third independent single, "Femininomenon". Earmilk described the track as "so fun and loud but so intricate" and noted that it differed from Roan's earlier releases. Roan said the song, produced by Nigro, was an attempt to "get away with being as ridiculous as I possibly can". The accompanying self‑directed music video features Roan riding a dirt bike.

=== 2023–present: Breakthrough with The Rise and Fall of a Midwest Princess ===
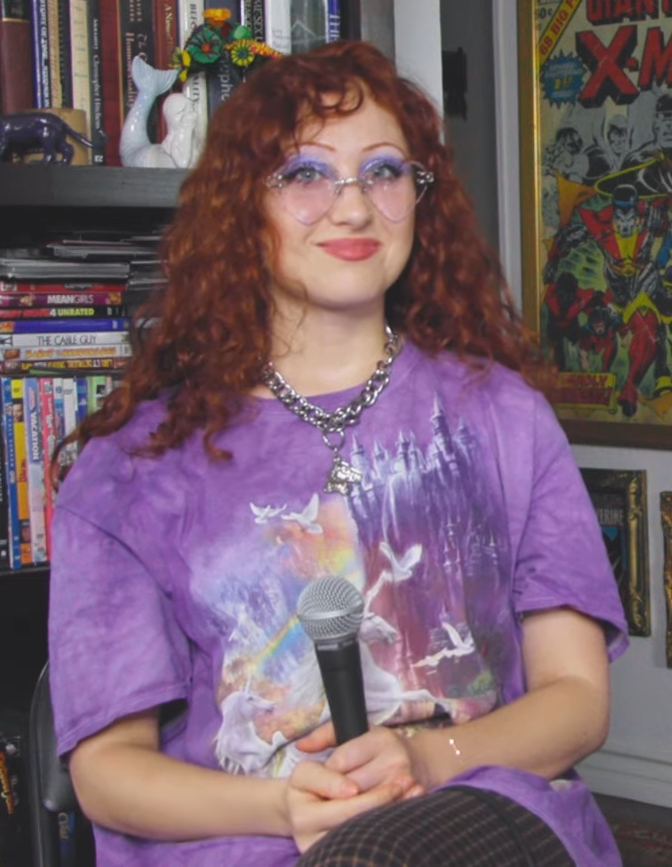
Roan in an October 2023 interview with Popdust

In February 2023, Roan embarked on the Naked in North America Tour, her debut headlining tour. Each stop on the tour had a theme, with Roan suggesting outfits for fans while making her own camp costumes herself. Inspired by Orville Peck, Roan chose to book drag queens as openers for the tour. Concerts from the tour received positive reviews in The Harvard Crimson and Variety, with Jem Aswad describing it as a concert where "you recognize when a new-ish artist's career is about to blast off" similar to Lorde in 2013 and Billie Eilish in 2019.

In March 2023, Roan released the music video for "Casual". The song, produced by Nigro, criticizes a romantic partner who refuses to commit and was inspired by Roan's brief relationship during the COVID-19 pandemic that ended with her partner saying they had met someone else. That same month, Roan signed with Amusement Records, a label created by Nigro expressly for Roan. To provide major label support, Roan also co-signed with Island Records, after seeking out 9 different potential partners. Later that year, she released the singles "Kaleidoscope", "Red Wine Supernova" and "Hot to Go!".

On September 22, 2023, Roan released her debut full-length album, The Rise and Fall of a Midwest Princess, and began her second headlining tour, the Midwest Princess Tour. The tour, ending in the spring of 2024, traveled across North America and had shows in London, Paris, Berlin, Melbourne, Brisbane, Sydney, and Amsterdam. Roan donated $1 per ticket sold to the nonprofit For the Gworls and opened each show with drag performers. The Rise and Fall of a Midwest Princess was included in various best-albums-of-2023 year-end lists, such as those by The A.V. Club, Time, Nylon, Dork, Rolling Stone, Billboard, and Vogue. It was also listed as one of Pitchfork's 22 Best Pop Albums of 2023 and was named PopBuzz's Number One Album of 2023.

Roan opened for Olivia Rodrigo's Guts World Tour in the United States and Canada from February to April 2024. In Roan's first week of the tour, her streams rose by 32 percent. Also in February, Roan was a musical guest on The Late Show with Stephen Colbert. In March, NPR Music released Roan's Tiny Desk Concert performance.

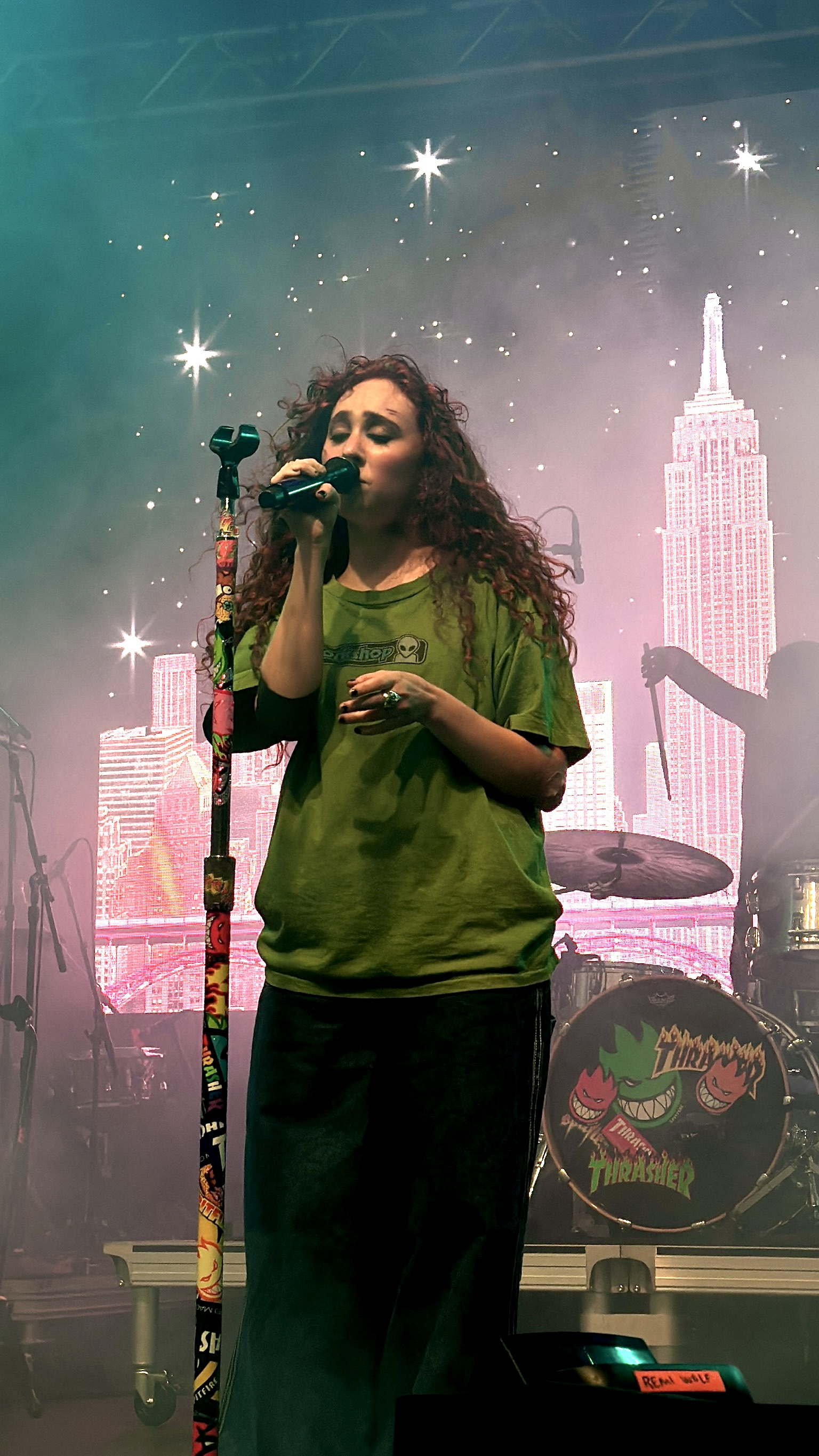
Roan performing at Capitol Hill Block Party in Seattle, Washington, July 2024

In April 2024, Roan released the single "Good Luck, Babe!". The song speaks about compulsory heterosexuality, describing a woman trying to deny her romantic feelings for Roan and women in general. Praised by Billboard as a "well-deserved breakthrough", the song received 7 million streams in its first week, was listed in the Spotify top ten, and debuted at number 77 on the Billboard Hot 100. The song was Roan's fastest to hit 100 million streams on the platform. By June, the song became her first top 20 hit on the Billboard Hot 100, and by September, it reached a peak of number four, becoming her first top ten song on the chart. Although not included on her debut album, the single's success was a catalyst for propelling it to worldwide recognition. In June 2024, The Rise and Fall of a Midwest Princess entered the top ten on the Billboard 200 for the first time, with more than 40,000 equivalent album units sold. By August, the album had reached number two.

Also in April, Roan performed at Coachella. At this time, Roan saw growing success on Spotify, with her monthly listeners increasing more than 500% from February to April. As reported by Billboard, by June 2024, Roan's weekly streams had grown by more than twenty-fold from the start of the year.

During her performance at the Governors Ball Music Festival, Roan debuted a previously unreleased song titled "The Subway", continuing to work towards a new album. At a concert in June, Roan spoke to the crowd, stating "I think my career is just kind of going really fast and it's really hard to keep up. I'm just being honest, I'm having a hard time today. [...] This is all I've ever wanted—it's just heavy sometimes." Her performance at Lollapalooza in August drew the biggest daytime set ever seen at the festival.

In September, Roan performed at the 2024 MTV Video Music Awards and won Best New Artist. She dedicated the trophy to queer and trans people. In October 2024, she reached number one for the first time on the Billboard Artist 100, coinciding with the biggest sales week ever of her debut album. Roan appeared as the musical guest on Saturday Night Live on November 2, 2024, with host John Mulaney, where she performed and teased a new country-tinged song titled "The Giver". Roan appeared in the Netflix special A Nonsense Christmas with Sabrina Carpenter on December 6, 2024. In January 2025, Roan was named the winner of the Sound of 2025 poll of musicians and music experts, organized annually by the BBC.

In February 2025 at the 67th Grammy Awards, Roan won her first Grammy Award for Best New Artist. In her acceptance speech, she called for record labels to provide artists with a living wage and healthcare. Roan's The Rise and Fall of a Midwest Princess was nominated for Album of the Year and Best Pop Vocal Album, and "Good Luck, Babe!" was nominated for Record of the Year, Song of the Year, and Best Pop Solo Performance. Following Roan's Grammy acceptance speech, the former music executive Jeff Rabhan wrote an essay via The Hollywood Reporter criticizing Roan's acceptance speech as naive and saying labels do not have responsibilities to artists outside paying advances and royalties. The piece went viral, and Roan responded by challenging Rabhan to match a $25,000 donation to artists experiencing financial difficulty.

On March 14, 2025, Roan released "The Giver" on all platforms. In June, she embarked on a new tour, titled the "Visions of Damsels & Other Dangerous Things Tour". It was announced in July that the tour would be coming to New York City; Kansas City, Missouri; and Pasadena, California. On July 31, 2025, Roan released "The Subway", more than a year after it first premiered at her 2024 Governor's Ball set. The song was later nominated at the 68th Annual Grammy Awards in the categories Record of the Year and Best Pop Solo Performance.

In February 2026, Roan announced she was terminating her representation by Wasserman, the talent agency led by Casey Wasserman, due to the businessman's past association with Ghislaine Maxwell which was revealed in the Epstein files. On June 22, Roan was announced as part of the lineup for Olivia Rodrigo's Daisy Chain Fields music festival in Irvine, California on August 29.

Roan is featured on a remix of Olivia Rodrigo's "Expectations" and its accompanying music video, both released on October 15. The remix was named the week's "Best New Track" by music magazine Pitchfork, with writer Shaad D'Souza opining that Roan's voice contains a natural "new-wave-y" quality.

== Artistry ==
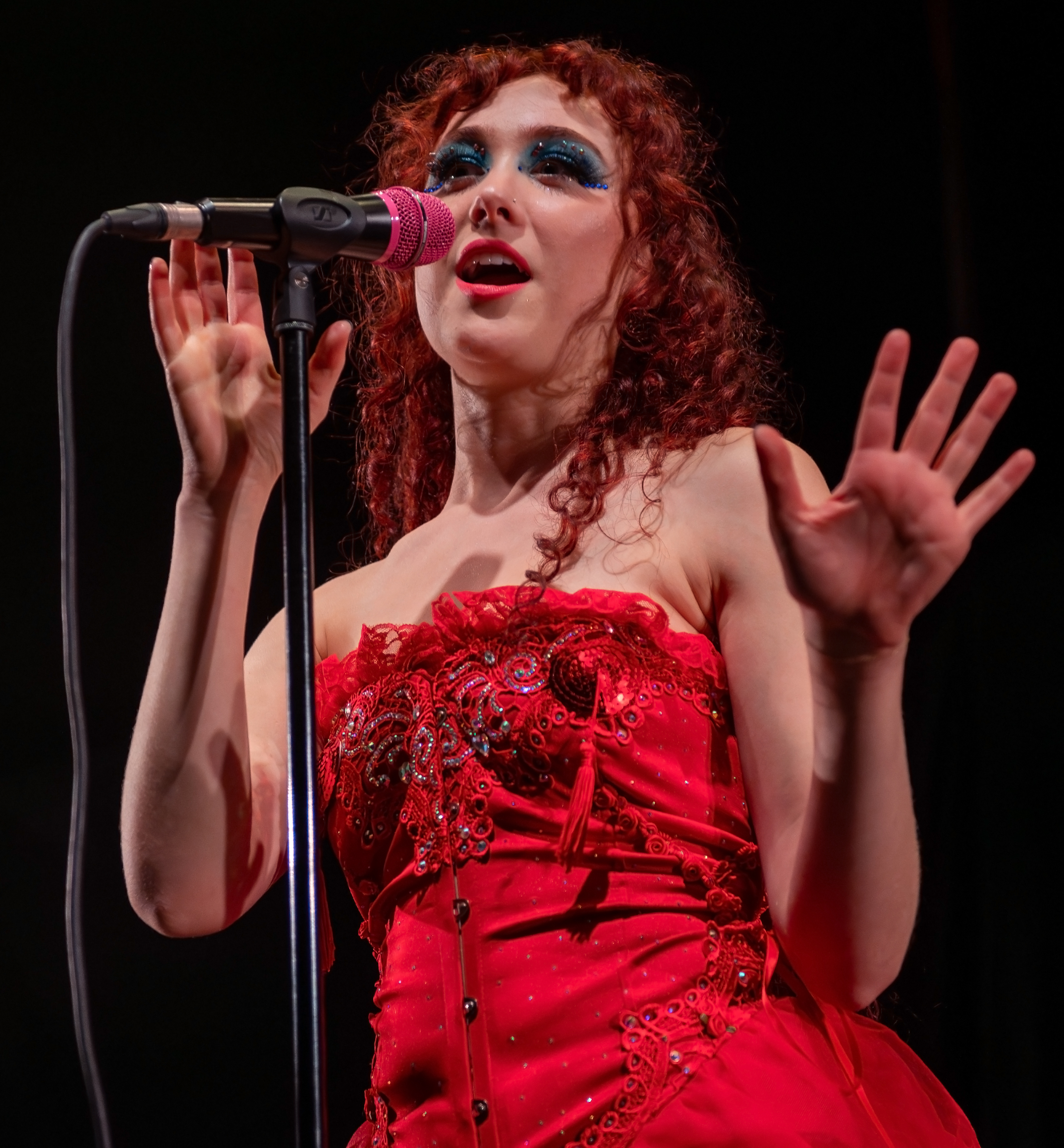
Roan performing at the Hollywood Palladium in 2022

Roan writes most of her songs with co-writers, most prominently her producer, Dan Nigro, with her song "Kaleidoscope" being the only song from her debut album written solely by Roan herself. After the release of her debut single, "Good Hurt", her style was described in Interview as "pop sound [...] infused with a dark and unsettling tone that underscores her intense, somber lyrics." In 2018, she described her musical style as a mix of organic and electronic sounds, with a pop tone, and as "dark pop with ballad undertones". In her songs written while she was a teenager, according to Atwood Magazine, she "brought the hardship and turbulence of our teenaged years to life with a candidness and vividness seldom seen from her peers." Roan describes her music as "kind of the fairytale version of what happened in real life" as her persona is a larger-than-life version of her real self. Roan's music has been described as pop, dance-pop, synth-pop, art pop, alternative pop, indie pop, disco, and pop rock.

=== Voice ===
"Good Hurt (acoustic)"
Roan singing the live, acoustic version of her song "Good Hurt" in 2017. She has criticized herself for "singing wrong" before taking vocal lessons in 2022. Constance Grady of Vox compared Roan's singing at the time to cursive singing.

"The Subway"
Roan sustaining a note in "The Subway" live in January 2026

Roan has received praise for her vocal abilities since her early days. In 2014, Troye Sivan and Connor Franta commended the then-16-year-old Roan's singing. Sivan said that he had not heard a voice like Roan's since Adele, and Franta called her a "vocally gifted goddess". Despite this, Roan has criticized her past singing, saying that she never had a "proper" vocal lesson until December 2022 and that she had been "singing wrong" for 10 years. In a Vox feature, Constance Grady described Roan's vocal style in her early music as the "indie girl slur that was so popular at the time" and likened it to singing in cursive. She named "Pink Pony Club" as the song that marked the beginning of Roan's vocal evolution.

Roan has been described as having a soprano vocal range, and has demonstrated use of the whistle register on songs such as "After Midnight". Writing for the official Grammy Awards site, Kelly Nguyen lauded Roan's "near-perfect vocal stability". In a review of Roan's live show at Heaven, a gay club in London, Poppie Platt of The Daily Telegraph praised Roan's "soaring, pitch-perfect high notes", writing that each note "shudder[ed] with feeling".

=== Inspirations ===
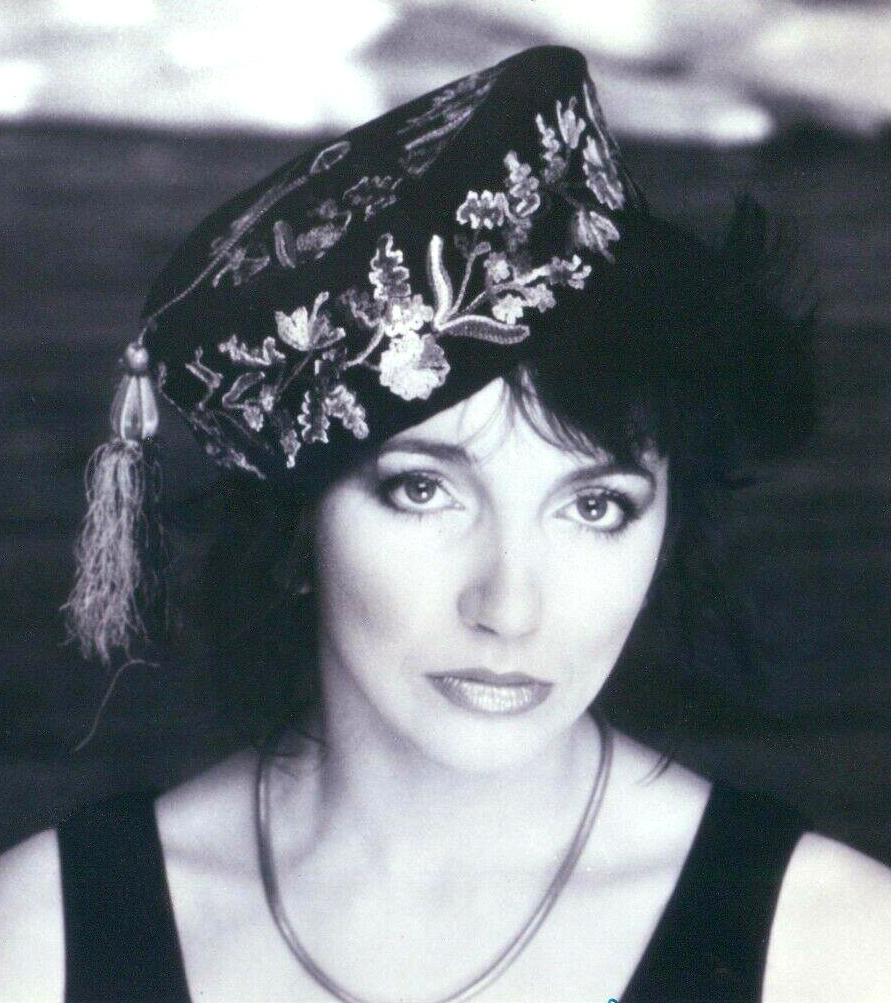
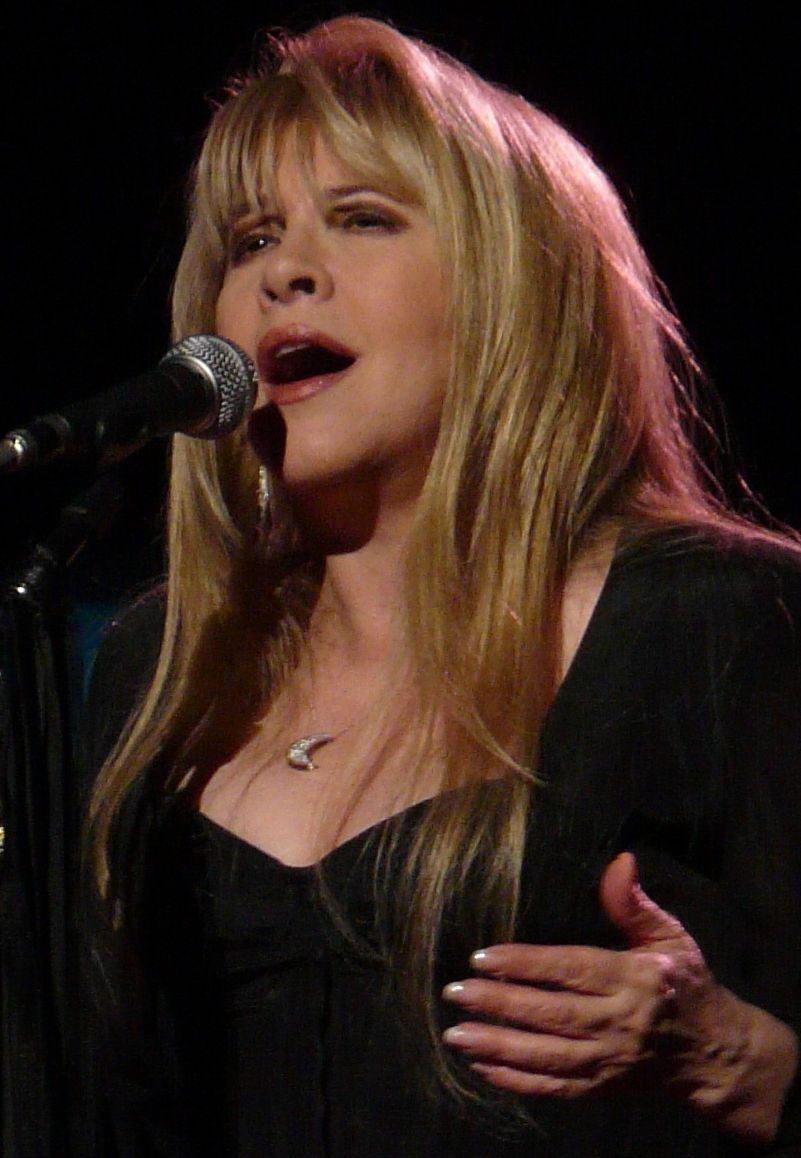
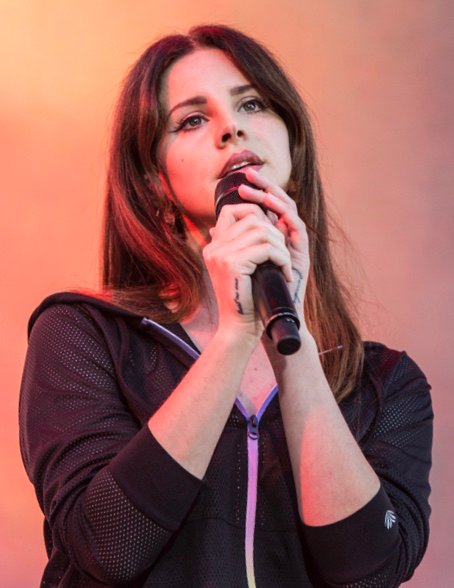
Roan's musical influences include artists such as (left to right) Kate Bush, Stevie Nicks, and Lana Del Rey.

Roan has stated she was raised on Christian rock during her childhood but never identified with it, and was more curious about pop music. In a 2023 interview for Pop Crave, she said she listened to Lorde, Lana Del Rey, and Ellie Goulding throughout her high school years. Discovering artists like Katy Perry, Kesha, Britney Spears, and Pink during her adolescence influenced Roan to start writing music and construct her onstage persona. She has stated that the song "Stay" by Rihanna inspired her to begin writing music. Roan named "The Book of Love" by the Magnetic Fields as the greatest song she has ever heard on a podcast in 2022.

Among the artistic influences Roan has named are the artist Abbey Watkins, the film The Beguiled, and musical artists Kate Bush, alt-J, Stevie Nicks, Ellie Goulding, Karen Carpenter, Lorde, and Lana Del Rey. Interviewed on the red carpet at the 2025 Grammy Awards, she credited Madonna, Rihanna and Nicki Minaj as women who made queer music mainstream. Speaking to drag performer Anania in 2025, Roan stated that Alanis Morissette's Jagged Little Pill (1995) was the album that "made [her] gay". In 2023, a Variety article described Roan as "glammy and pop and embracing her femininity and [...] very queer-positive." She has cited Minaj and Lady Gaga as inspirations for her attitude towards making people feel confident with her music. She has cited Beyoncé as an influence on her stage presence. She has expressed admiration for Ariana Grande, calling herself "an Arianator". Roan has stated that she is a fan of the video game Old School RuneScape and its synth-heavy soundtrack.

Roan's makeup and hair is primarily inspired by drag makeup, including queens like Violet Chachki. Her makeup also takes inspiration from Boy George, 1980s punk fashion, and Vivienne Westwood. Roan described her makeup looks for the Coachella festival as "Paris Hilton and James St. James or Walt Cassidy became one and put on a drag show." She is also heavily inspired by the Club Kids scene. While on The Tonight Show with Jimmy Fallon, Roan stated her stage looks reference horror movies, burlesque, and theater. She also described her outlook for her on-stage costumes, "I love looking pretty and scary. Or, like, pretty and tacky. Or just not pretty. I love that too. I just think it's just not serious, I love that fans find such deep meanings to things and I'm just like, 'I don't know, I thought I looked hot.' Like, I don't know if it's anything more than that." Roan considers herself a drag queen with her own persona, stating, "I've never fully understood why women shouldn't be allowed to do drag because – yes, I do drag! [...] It feels like they don't like women doing certain things. Another man trying to tell a woman what to do. Just try telling me what to do! I'm a drag queen – whether you like it when women do it or not."

== Cultural impact ==
Roan's success has led her to be called a "queer pop icon", "a superstar in the making", and a "visionary performer". Roan has been credited with leading a "lesbian pop renaissance" on the music charts and within the cultural zeitgeist. Roan's music brought the concept of compulsory heterosexuality into the forefront of mainstream pop music. She has been praised for her "unapologetic authenticity" and "expression of her queerness and femininity" in her music and live performances, inspiring young women to embrace their own sexuality. She has also been applauded for her image "rejecting the male gaze" within the pop landscape. Roan has been praised for her "punkish" attitude towards the status quo for queer performers and applauded for "rewriting the rules of lovelorn pop". Rolling Stone described watching Roan's performances as "like watching Michelangelo craft the statue of David in real time".

A number of critics have grouped her with younger women pop artists of the 2020s whose songs and personae have an emotional honesty and complexity that contrasts with slick pop orthodoxy. At the end of 2024, Scottie Andrew for CNN grouped her with Charli XCX and Sabrina Carpenter as "uncompromising", "confessional", "personal and specific"; while Ken Tucker on NPR referred to "a pattern of women hitmakers who prize both aggression and vulnerability in various proportions" also citing the same trio. In 2026, Joe Muggs for The Arts Desk suggested a lineage linking Roan, Carpenter, Olivia Rodrigo and Laufey with Lana Del Rey, Billie Eilish and Mitski who express "poetic but plain-spoken self-interrogation" - while Álvaro Alonso de la Fuente in Cosmopolitan spoke of women like Roan, Rodrigo and Ariana Grande putting "complex, contradictory, and until now uncommon emotions into their music".

In 2024, Roan gave a guest lecture at Harvard Medical School. When searching for Roan's name on Google, users are prompted with "Did you mean: your favorite artist's favorite artist", which references a viral clip of Roan introducing herself on stage at the Coachella Music Festival. This was inspired by Roan's favorite drag performer and now drag mother Sasha Colby. Roan joked the search term was caused by a "random twink who works at Google" and stated that she modified Colby's phrase as she hoped Colby would one day watch and recognize her. The two met in July 2024 while performing at Capitol Hill Block Party, where Colby asked Roan to join the House of Colby as her daughter.

In June 2024, Roan revealed she had declined an invitation from the White House to perform for that year's Pride celebration. During the Governors Ball Music Festival, Roan stated, "we want liberty, justice and freedom for all. When you do that, that's when I'll come", mentioning the Israeli–Palestinian conflict and transgender rights. Roan later revealed that she considered attending, but instead of performing music, she would recite poetry by Palestinian women. Roan said that her publicist was supportive of the idea, but warned her that doing so at the White House would likely compromise her and her family's safety, which is why she decided to decline the invitation instead.

In August 2024, the Kamala Harris 2024 presidential campaign released a baseball cap with the words "Harris Walz" in a similar style to Roan's "Midwest Princess" merchandise baseball cap. In response, Roan tweeted "is this real". Roan refused to endorse the Harris campaign but confirmed she would vote for Harris, stating that "endorsing and voting are completely different." Explaining the decision, she said, "Fuck Trump for fucking real, but fuck some of the shit that has gone down in the Democratic Party that has failed people like me and you — and, more so, Palestine, and more so, every marginalized community in the world."

Roan launched the Midwest Princess Project in October 2025. A nonprofit organization, it aims to uplift trans youth and to protect other LGBTQ+ communities.

== Public image ==
Following her rapid commercial breakthrough, Roan publicly addressed the pressures of her newfound fame and criticized behavior from some fans that she considered "creepy" and "invasive". In multiple social media posts, she said she felt unsafe due to public harassment and stalking by fans, including attempts to contact members of her family.

In March 2026, while Roan was in São Paulo to perform at Lollapalooza Brazil, soccer player Jorginho alleged that Roan's security detail had aggressively confronted his wife and 11-year-old step-daughter during breakfast at a hotel, which led to an online backlash against Roan. Roan stated that she had been completely unaware of the incident and apologized to the mother and the child. The security guard later took full responsibility, saying he was not part of Roan's team and was not directed by her to confront the family. Afterwards, Jorginho retracted the allegation and said he did not support online attacks from any side.

== Personal life ==
Roan currently lives in Los Angeles, California. She is a lesbian. Though raised Christian, Roan no longer identifies with the church and said in 2023 that her relationship with religion is "evolving". She was diagnosed with bipolar II disorder at age 22, an illness that contributed to her difficult childhood. She has described therapy and medication as important parts of maintaining her mental health. She has also been diagnosed with severe depression, a condition that she said worsened with her rise to fame.

Roan has said that the idea of her trademark "tacky pop star" aesthetic came to her while discussing her inner child with her therapist. While "Chappell Roan" began solely as a stage name, she has since referred to it as her drag persona and compared it to Hannah Montana, describing the character as "more open and confident [...] especially regarding sex" than her real self.

== Discography ==
Studio albums

- The Rise and Fall of a Midwest Princess (2023)

== Filmography ==
=== Film ===
Year	Title	Role	Notes	Ref.
2024	Olivia Rodrigo: Guts World Tour	Herself	Concert film	
2024	A Nonsense Christmas with Sabrina Carpenter	Herself	Christmas special	

=== Television ===
Year	Title	Role	Notes	Ref.
2024	Saturday Night Live	Herself	Musical guest; Season 50, Episode 5	
2025	RuPaul's Drag Race All Stars	Herself	Guest judge; Season 10, episode 5 ("Rappin' Roast")	
2026	Hannah Montana 20th Anniversary Special	Herself	Cameo appearance; television special	

=== Video games ===
Year	Title	Role	Notes	Ref.
2026	Fortnite	Herself	Theme of Fortnite Festival Season 13; Various music and emotes	

== Awards and nominations ==
Award	Year (Note: Each year is linked to the article about the awards held that year, wherever possible.)	Recipient(s) and nominee(s)	Category	Result	Ref.
American Music Awards	2025	Herself	Artist of the Year	Nominated	
American Music Awards	2025	Herself	New Artist of the Year	Nominated	
American Music Awards	2025	Herself	Favorite Female Pop Artist	Nominated	
American Music Awards	2025	The Rise and Fall of a Midwest Princess	Album of the Year	Nominated	
American Music Awards	2025	The Rise and Fall of a Midwest Princess	Favorite Pop Album	Nominated	
American Music Awards	2025	"Good Luck, Babe!"	Favorite Pop Song	Nominated	
American Music Awards	2025	"Hot to Go!"	Social Song of the Year	Nominated	
ARIA Music Awards	2024	Herself	Most Popular International Artist	Nominated	
ASCAP Pop Music Awards	2025	"Good Luck, Babe!"	Winning Songwriters and Publishers	Won	
ASCAP Pop Music Awards	2025	"Hot to Go!"	Winning Songwriters and Publishers	Won	
BBC Sound of...	2025	Herself	BBC Sound of 2025	Won	
Billboard Music Awards	2024	Herself	Top New Artist	Won	
Billboard Music Awards	2024	Herself	Top Female Artist	Nominated	
BMI Pop Awards	2025	"Red Wine Supernova"	Most Performed Songs	Won	
BreakTudo Awards	2024	Herself	International New Artist of the Year	Nominated	
BRIT Awards	2025	"Good Luck, Babe!"	Best International Song	Won	
BRIT Awards	2025	Herself	Best International Artist	Won	
BRIT Awards	2026	Herself	Best International Artist	Nominated	
BRIT Awards	2026	"Pink Pony Club"	Best International Song	Nominated	
Danish Music Awards	2024	"Good Luck, Babe!"	International Hit of the Year	Nominated	
Danish Music Awards	2024	The Rise and Fall of a Midwest Princess	International Album of the Year	Nominated	
Grammy Awards	2025	"Good Luck, Babe!"	Record of the Year	Nominated	
Grammy Awards	2025	"Good Luck, Babe!"	Song of the Year	Nominated	
Grammy Awards	2025	"Good Luck, Babe!"	Best Pop Solo Performance	Nominated	
Grammy Awards	2025	The Rise and Fall of a Midwest Princess	Album of the Year	Nominated	
Grammy Awards	2025	The Rise and Fall of a Midwest Princess	Best Pop Vocal Album	Nominated	
Grammy Awards	2025	Herself	Best New Artist	Won	
Grammy Awards	2026	"The Subway"	Record of the Year	Nominated	
Grammy Awards	2026	"The Subway"	Best Pop Solo Performance	Nominated	
iHeartRadio Music Awards	2025	Herself	Pop Artist of the Year	Nominated	
iHeartRadio Music Awards	2025	Herself	Best New Pop Artist	Nominated	
iHeartRadio Music Awards	2025	Herself	Favorite Surprise Guest (with Olivia Rodrigo)	Nominated	
iHeartRadio Music Awards	2025	"Hot to Go!"	Favorite Tour Tradition	Nominated	
iHeartRadio Music Awards	2025	"Good Luck, Babe!"	Best Lyrics	Nominated	
iHeartRadio Music Awards	2025	The Midwest Princess Tour	Favorite Tour Style	Nominated	
iHeartRadio Music Awards	2026	"Pink Pony Club"	Pop Song of the Year	Nominated	
MTV Europe Music Awards	2024	Herself	Best New	Nominated	
MTV Europe Music Awards	2024	Herself	Best Push	Nominated	
MTV Europe Music Awards	2024	Herself	Biggest Fans	Nominated	
MTV Europe Music Awards	2024	"Good Luck, Babe!"	Best Song	Nominated	
MTV Video Music Awards	2024	Herself	Best New Artist	Won	
MTV Video Music Awards	2024	"Red Wine Supernova"	Push Performance of the Year	Nominated	
MTV Video Music Awards	2024	"Hot to Go!"	Best Trending Video	Nominated	
MTV Video Music Awards	2024	"Good Luck, Babe!"	Song of Summer	Nominated	
MTV Video Music Awards	2025	"The Subway"	Song of Summer	Nominated	
Nickelodeon Kids' Choice Awards	2025	"Pink Pony Club"	Favorite Viral Song	Nominated	
Nickelodeon Kids' Choice Awards	2025	Herself	Favorite Female Breakout Artist	Nominated	
NRJ Music Awards	2024	Herself	International Breakthrough of the Year	Nominated	
Pollstar Awards	2025	Herself	Support/Special Guest of the Year	Won	
Pollstar Awards	2025	Herself	New Headliner of the Year	Won	
Triple J Hottest 100	2024	"Good Luck, Babe!"	Song of the Year	Won	
UK Music Video Awards	2025	"The Subway"	Best Pop Video – International	Nominated	
Vevo DSCVR	2024	Herself	Artist of the Year	Won	

== Tours ==
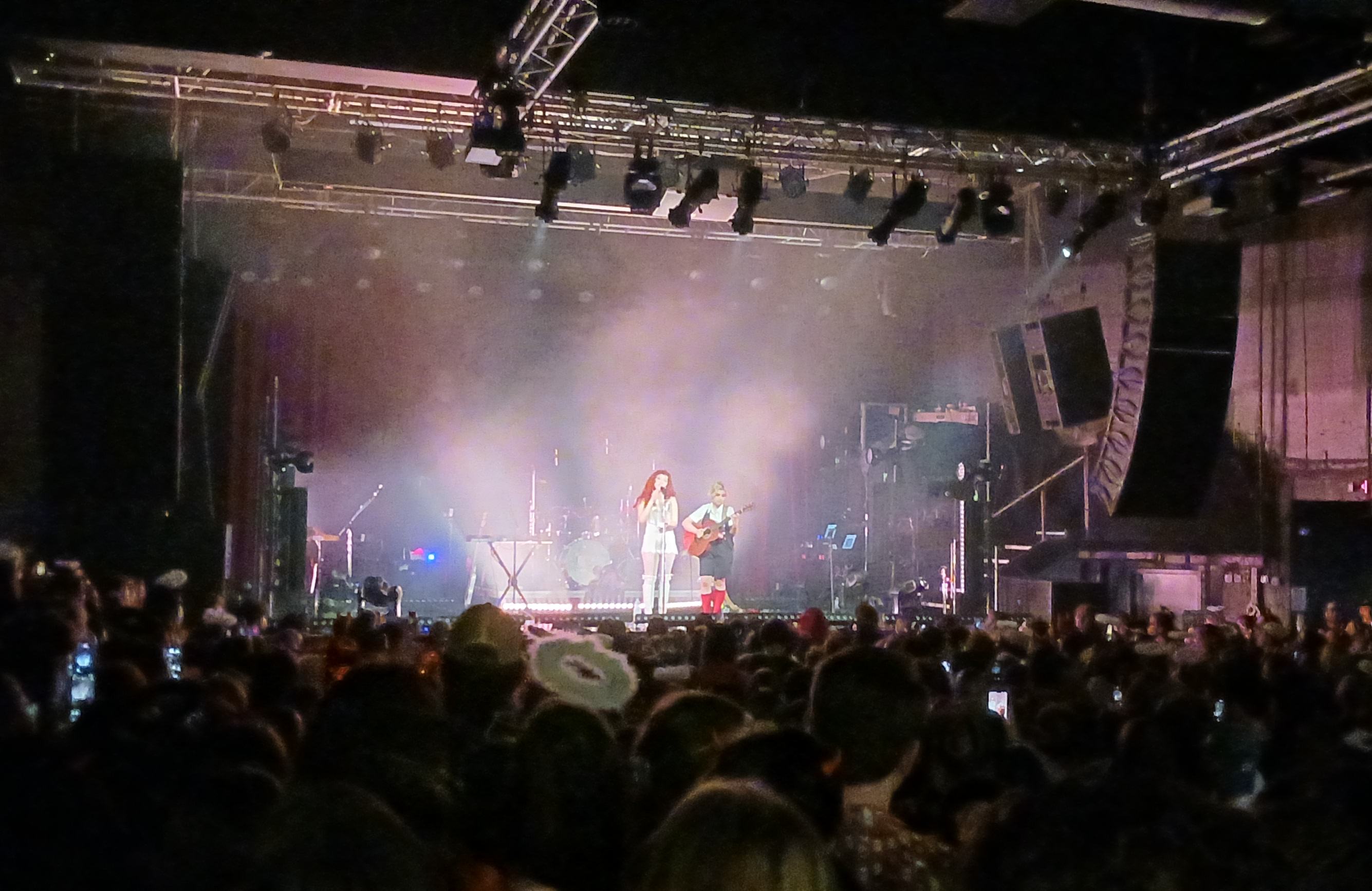
Chappell Roan performing at First Avenue on the Midwest Princess Tour in 2023

=== Headlining ===
- Naked in North America Tour (2023)
- The Midwest Princess Tour (2023–2024)
- Visions of Damsels & Other Dangerous Things Tour (2025–2026)

=== Supporting ===
- Vance Joy – Lay It On Me Tour (2017)
- Coast Modern – On Tour (2017)
- Declan McKenna – What Do You Think About the Car? Tour (2018)
- Olivia Rodrigo – Sour Tour (2022)
- Ben Platt – The Reverie Tour (2022)
- Fletcher – Girl of My Dreams Tour (2022)
- Olivia Rodrigo – Guts World Tour (2024)
