= Marianne Mithun =

American linguist (born 1946)

- Marianne Mithun in 2020
- Born: 1946 (age 79–80)
- Occupation: Professor of Linguistics
- Spouse: Wallace Chafe (died 2019)
- Awards: 2021 Neil and Saras Smith Medal; 2018 Wilbur Cross Medal

Academic background
- Education: 1974 PhD Yale University, Linguistics; 1972(M.Phil)Yale; 1972(MA.) Yale; 1969 BA., Pomona College, Phi Beta Kappa, French
- Thesis: A Grammar of Tuscarora (1974)
- Doctoral advisor: Floyd Lounsbury

Academic work
- Discipline: Linguistics
- Sub-discipline: Morphology, syntax, discourse, prosody, and their interrelations; language contact and language change; typology and universals; language documentation; American Indian linguistics; Austronesian linguistics
- Notable works: The Languages of Native North America
- Website: https://www.linguistics.ucsb.edu/people/marianne-mithun

Marianne Mithun (/mɪˈθuːn/ mih-THOON; born 1946) is an American linguist specializing in American Indian languages and language typology. She is a professor of linguistics at the University of California, Santa Barbara, where she has held an academic position since 1986.

== Career ==
She began her career with extensive fieldwork on Iroquoian languages, especially Mohawk, Cayuga, and Tuscarora, earning her PhD in Linguistics from Yale in 1974 with a dissertation entitled "A Grammar of Tuscarora" (Floyd Lounsbury, dissertation supervisor). Her work spans a number of linguistic subfields, including morphology, syntax, discourse, prosody, language contact and change, typology, language documentation, and the interrelations among these subfields. She has worked on a wide variety of languages from a wide variety of language families, but specializes in Native American languages. Besides Iroquoian languages, she has also worked in California on Central Pomo and the Chumashan languages, on Central Alaskan Yup'ik, and on the Austronesian language Kapampangan.

Mithun compiled a comprehensive overview of Native American languages in The Languages of Native North America. A review on the Linguist List describes the work as "an excellent book to have as a reference" and as containing "an incredible amount of information and illustrative data." The work is a bipartite reference organized firstly by grammatical categories (including categories that are particularly widespread in North America, such as polysynthesis), and secondly by family.

Mithun and her husband, linguist Wallace Chafe, established and directed The Wallace Chafe and Marianne Mithun Fund for Research on Understudied Languages. The fund provides support for graduate students to cover expenses associated with language documentation projects for understudied languages.

== Awards and honors ==
Mithun was the founding president of the Society for Linguistic Anthropology from 1983 to 1985. From 1999 to 2003 she was president of the Association for Linguistic Typology. From 2014 to 2015 she was president of The Societas Linguistica Europaea. She is a member of the Norwegian Academy of Science and Letters.

In 2002 The Languages of Native North America won the Leonard Bloomfield Book Award, awarded annually by the Linguistic Society of America for the best book in linguistics. In 2008, Mithun was inducted as a Fellow of the Linguistic Society of America. In 2019, Mithun served as the vice president/president-elect of the Linguistic Society of America (LSA), and in 2020 she served as the 95th President of the LSA.

In 2021, she was awarded the Neil and Saras Smith Medal for Linguistics by the British Academy "for her research into Native American and Austronesian languages which represent a significant contribution to theoretical linguistics".

Mithun has taught at many institutions around the world, including Georgetown, La Trobe, Rice, Stanford, SUNY Albany, Amsterdam, Cagliari, Berkeley, Hamburg, UIUC, UNM, Wake Forest, and Yale.

== Selected works ==
- — (1984). "The evolution of noun incorporation". Language. 60 (4): 847–894. doi:10.1353/lan.1984.0038. S2CID 143600392.
- — (1991). "Active/Agentive case marking and its motivations". Language. 67 (3): 510–546. doi:10.1353/lan.1991.0015. S2CID 144965886.
- — (1999). The languages of native North America. Cambridge, UK: Cambridge University Press. ISBN 0-521-23228-7.
- — (2001). "Who shapes the record: The speaker and the linguist". In Newman, Paul; Ratliff, Martha (eds.). Linguistic Fieldwork: Essays on the Practice of Empirical Linguistic Research. Cambridge: Cambridge University Press. pp. 34–54.
