= Cursive singing =

Singing technique

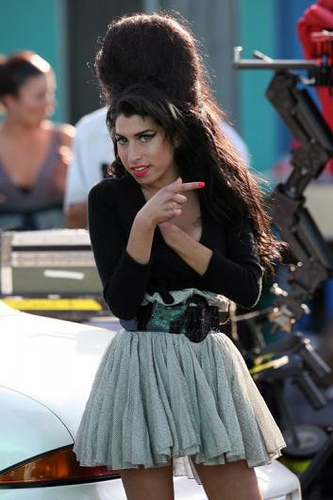
Cursive singing was developed by singers such as Amy Winehouse (pictured).

Cursive singing, or indie singing, is a singing technique in which the vocalist elongates vowels, frequently leaves out consonants at the end of words, and blends words in a run-on manner. The style creates an effect that can be described as "dreamy" or "playful" and is sometimes reminiscent of yodeling.

As of the 2020s, cursive singing remains common in popular music, as well as among amateur singers.

== History ==
The style being described as "cursive" originated on Twitter in 2009, when user @TRACKDROPPA tweeted, "Voice so smooth its [sic] like I'm singing in cursive". It is also referred to as "indie singing" (or similar variations, such as "indie-pop voice") for its common use in indie music.

Cursive singing has foundations in gospel, jazz, R&B, and soul music, in which syllables are often added to words to better fit rhythms. Its current form was developed by Macy Gray, Corinne Bailey Rae, and Amy Winehouse and was further popularized by singers such as Adele and Lorde in the 2010s.

== Reception ==
Although it remains popular, cursive singing is sometimes critiqued for its perceived overuse in songs such as "Dance Monkey" by Tones and I. It has also been parodied on social media.

Some linguistics researchers and music professors have defended cursive singing as innovative and based in historic styles. Bryan Gick argues that the critique is partly rooted in misogyny: "There's a sense that this is not the proper way to speak because these people [women] are not serious members of society, and this represents some kind of degradation of the standards of language". He also noted its growing use by male singers such as Shawn Mendes.

== See also ==
- Portamento
