= Portamento =

Pitch sliding from one note to another

In music, portamento (pl.: portamenti; from old portamento, meaning 'carriage' or 'carrying'), also known by its French name glissade, is a pitch sliding from one note to another. The term originated from the Italian expression portamento della voce ('carriage of the voice'), denoting from the beginning of the 17th century its use in vocal performances and emulation by members of the violin family and certain wind instruments, and is sometimes used interchangeably with anticipation. It is also applied to one type of glissando on, e.g., slide trombones, as well as to the "glide" function of steel guitars and synthesizers.

== Vocal portamento ==
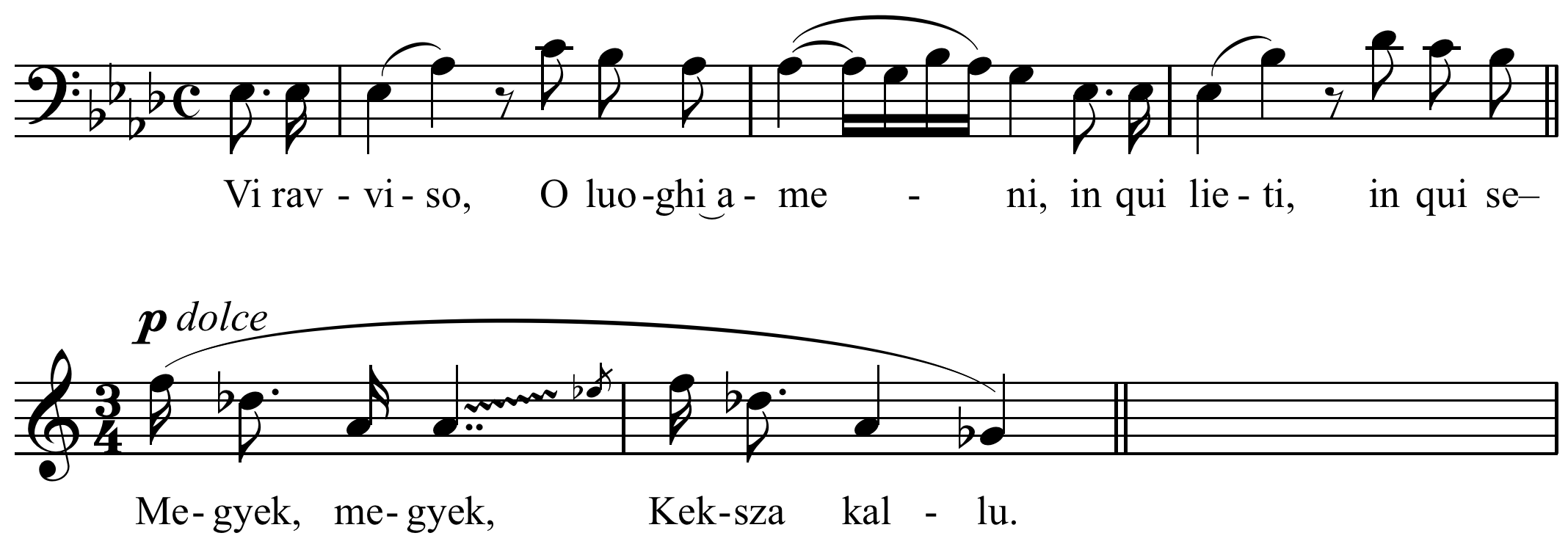

In the first example, Rodolfo's first aria in La sonnambula (1831), the portamento is indicated by the slur between the third and fourth notes. The second example, Judit's first line in Bluebeard's Castle (1912) by composer Béla Bartók, employs an inclining, wavy line between the fourth and fifth notes to indicate a continuous, steady rise in pitch. Portamento may, of course, also be used for descending intervals.

== Opinions of vocal portamento ==
In the performance of Italian bel canto music, the concept of the musical slur and that of the true portamento have not always been held to mean the same thing. This is explained simply by Nicola Vaccai in his Practical Method of Italian Singing, originally published 1832, whose opinion in the matter holds some authority. In the sense described by Vaccai, the portamento is not a slur but an ornamental accentuation of the legato linking two distinct notes, without any slide or glide through the intervening notes. In his own opening statements forming the preface to his Lesson XIII, "Modo per portare la voce" (method to carry the voice), Vaccai states: "By carrying the voice from one note to another, it is not meant that you should drag or drawl the voice through all the intermediate intervals, an abuse that is frequently committed—but it means, to 'unite' perfectly the one note with the other." He goes on to describe and illustrate that where a consonant falls between the two notes to be ligatured in this way, the portamento is achieved either by "almost insensibly" anticipating the second note of a pair in the final moments of the vowel sound preceding it, or else by minutely deferring the "salto" or leap between the notes until the first moment of the vowel sound in the second note. He adds, "In phrases requiring much grace and expression, it produces a very good effect: the abuse of it, however, is to be carefully avoided, as it leads to mannerism and monotony."

However, Manuel García (1805–1906), a singing pedagogue of immense renown, in his New Compendious Treatise of the Art of Singing, Part 1, Chapter VII, "On Vocalization or Agility (Agilità)", gave the opposite opinion. Writing of the means by which the voice is conducted from one note to another, he distinguished between "con portamento" (the gliding or slurring mode) and "legato" (simply the smooth mode of vocalization). "To slur is to conduct the voice from one note to another through all the intermediate sounds. ... This dragging of the notes will assist in equalizing the registers, timbres and power of the voice." He warned that learners should not acquire the bad habit of attacking a note with a slur, a prevailing fault in bad singers. As to "Smooth or Legato Vocalization (Agilità legata e granita)", it means, "to pass from one sound to another in a neat, sudden, and smooth manner, without interrupting the flow of voice; yet not allowing it to drag or slur over any intermediate sound ... as with the slurred sounds, the air must be subjected to a regular and continuous pressure, so as intimately to unite all the notes with each other."

There was, therefore, a difference of opinion between these two very distinguished singing masters of the 19th century as to the meaning of portamento, and its relation to the legato and the musical slur. It reflected not merely a distinction of terminology but divergent understandings of a fundamental aspect of singing technique. It should also be borne in mind that a curving line or phrase-mark (similar to a slur mark) is the usual way, in vocal notation, of indicating to the singer that the vowel sound of a word should be carried over or ligatured upon two or more consecutive notes (as in a roulade), and that in such usage legato and not slurring is always intended unless the slur is specifically indicated.

Although portamento (in the sense of slurring) continued to be widely used in popular music, it was disapproved of for operatic singing by many critics in the 1920s and 1930s as a sign of either poor technique, or of bad taste, a mark of cheap sentimentalism or showiness. This is not valid criticism of a performer when portamento is explicitly specified in the score or is otherwise appropriate. However, when there is no such specification, the singer is expected to be able to move crisply from note to note without any slurring or "scooping".

== See also ==
- Cursive singing
- Glissando
- Legato
- List of ornaments
- Meend
- Nonchord tone#Portamento
- Pitch wheel
- Portato, also rarely called "portamento"
- Vibrato

== Bibliography ==
- Benjamin, Thomas. 2005. The Craft of Modal Counterpoint: A Practical Approach, second edition. New York: Routledge. ISBN 0-415-97171-3 (cloth); ISBN 0-415-97172-1 (pbk).
- García, Manuel. 1840 and 1847. Ecole de García: Traité Complet de l'Art du Chant par Manuel García fils. Mainz and Paris: Schott 1840 (part 1), 1847 (part 2).
- García, Manuel. 1871. García's New Treatise on the Art of Singing: a Compendious Method of Instruction, with Examples and Exercises for the Cultivation of the Voice, revised edition. Boston: Oliver Ditson Company. OCLC 224044902, Read at Archive.org.
- Gauldin, Robert. 1985. A Practical Approach to Sixteenth-Century Counterpoint. Englewood Cliffs, New Jersey: Prentice Hall. OCLC 59143146.
- Harris, Ellen T. "Portamento (i)". 2001. The New Grove Dictionary of Music and Musicians, second edition, edited by Stanley Sadie and John Tyrrell. London: Macmillan Publishers.
- Jeppesen, Knud. 1946. The Style of Palestrina and the Dissonance, translated by Margaret Williams Hamerik, second revised and enlarged edition. Copenhagen: Ejnar Munksgaard Publisher; London: Geoffrey Cumberlege; Oxford University Press. Reprinted, with corrections, New York: Dover Publications, 1970. Reprinted again, Minneola, NY: Dover Publications, 2005. ISBN 0-486-44268-3.
- Merritt, Arthur Tillman. 1939. Sixteenth Century Polyphony: A Basic for the Study of Counterpoint. Cambridge, Massachusetts: Harvard University Press.
- Potter, John (1 November 2006). "Beggar at the Door: The Rise and Fall of Portamento in Singing". Music and Letters. 87 (4): 523–550. doi:10.1093/ml/gcl079. S2CID 193134321.
- Schenker, Heinrich. 2001. Counterpoint: A Translation of Kontrapunkt, by Heinrich Schenker: Volume II of New Musical Theories and Fantasies. Book 1: Cantus Firmus and Two-Voice Counterpoint, translated by John Rothgeb and Jürgen Thym, edited by John Rothgeb. Ann Arbor: Musicalia Press. 0-967-8099-1-6.
- Stewart, Robert. 1994. Introduction to 16th Century Counterpoint and Palestrina's Musical Style. Ardsley House Pub. ISBN 978-1-880157-07-7.
- Stowell, Robin. 2001. "Portamento (ii)". The New Grove Dictionary of Music and Musicians, second edition, edited by Stanley Sadie and John Tyrrell. London: Macmillan Publishers.
- Vaccai, Nicola. 1832. Metodo pratico di canto italiano per camera, diviso in venti due lezioni. London. Bilingual Italian and German edition, as Metodo pratico di canto italiano per camera, diviso in venti due lezioni / Praktische Schule des italienischen Gesanges in 22 Lectionen. Berlin: Schlesinger'sche Buch- und Musikhandlung, 1875.
- Vaccai, Nicola. 1975. Practical Method of Italian Singing, edited by John G. Paton. New York: G. Schirmer.
