= Wallace Chafe =

American linguist (1927–2019)

- Born: September 3, 1927; Cambridge, Massachusetts, U.S.
- Died: February 3, 2019 (aged 91); Santa Barbara, California, U.S.
- Other name: Háíwëögwas (Seneca)
- Occupation: Linguist
- Spouse: Marianne Mithun

Academic background
- Education: Yale University (Ph.D., 1958)

Academic work
- Institutions: University of California, Berkeley; University of California, Santa Barbara
- Main interests: Indigenous languages of the Americas

Wallace L. Chafe (/ˈtʃeɪf/ CHAYF; September 3, 1927 – February 3, 2019) was an American linguist. He was Professor Emeritus and research professor at The University of California, Santa Barbara.

== Biography ==
Chafe was born in Cambridge, Massachusetts. He was a student of Bernard Bloch and Floyd Lounsbury at Yale University, where he obtained his doctorate in 1958. From 1975 to 1985 he was the director of the Survey of California and Other Indian Languages at the University of California, Berkeley. He later moved to the University of California, Santa Barbara, and became professor emeritus at UCSB in 1991.

Chafe was a cognitivist; he considered semantics to be a basic component of language. He was a critic of Noam Chomsky's generative linguistics.

He was an influential scholar in Indigenous languages of the Americas, notably Iroquoian and Caddoan languages, in discourse analysis and psycholinguistics, and also prosody of speech. During his work among the Seneca, Chafe was named Háíwëögwas, literally 'he collects words'.

Together with Johanna Nichols, he edited a seminal volume on evidentiality in language in 1986.

While at UC Santa Barbara, he and his wife, linguist Marianne Mithun, established and directed The Wallace Chafe and Marianne Mithun Fund for Research on Understudied Languages. The fund provides support for graduate students to cover expenses associated with language documentation projects for understudied languages. Chafe died on February 3, 2019, in Santa Barbara, California.

== Selected works ==
- 1962. "Phonetics, semantics, and language." Language 38.335-344.
- 1963. Handbook of the Seneca Language, New York State Museum and Science Service, Bulletin #388; ISBN 1897367139
- 1967. Seneca Morphology and Dictionary. Smithsonian Contributions to Anthropology, vol. 4. Washington: Smithsonian Institution.
- 1968. "Idiomaticity as an Anomaly in the Chomskyan Paradigm." Foundations of Language 4.109-127.
- 1970. Meaning and the Structure of Language. Chicago: The University of Chicago Press.
- 1970. "A Semantically Based Sketch of Onondaga." International Journal of American Linguistics, Memoir 25 (Supplement to vol. 36, no. 2).
- 1976. "Givenness, contrastiveness, definiteness, subjects, topics, and point of view." In Subject and topic, edited by Charles N. Li, 25–55. New York: Academic Press.
- 1976. The Caddoan, Iroquoian, and Siouan languages. Trends in linguistics: State-of-the-art report (No. 3). The Hague: Mouton. ISBN 90-279-3443-6.
- 1980. The Pear Stories: Cognitive, Cultural, and Linguistic Aspects of Narrative Production. Norwood, NJ: Ablex.
- 1986. Evidentiality: The Linguistic Coding of Epistemology, edited by Wallace Chafe and Johanna Nichols. Norwood, N.J.: Ablex Pub. Corp. ISBN 0-89391-203-4
- 1988. "Linking Intonation Units in Spoken English." In Clause Combining in Grammar and Discourse, edited by John Haiman and Sandra A. Thompson, 1-27. Amsterdam/Philadelphia: John Benjamins.
- 1994. Discourse, Consciousness, and Time: The Flow and Displacement of Conscious Experience in Speaking and Writing. Chicago: The University of Chicago Press.
- 1996. "Beyond Beads on a String and Branches in a Tree." In Conceptual Structure, Discourse, and Language, edited by Adele Goldberg, 49–65. Stanford: Center for the Study of Language and Information.
- 2000. "The Interplay of Prosodic and Segmental Sounds in the Expression of Thoughts." Proceedings of the 23rd Annual Meeting of the Berkeley Linguistics Society, 1997, 389–401.
- 2000. "Loci of Diversity and Convergence in Thought and Language." In Explorations in Linguistic Relativity, edited by Martin Pütz and Marjolijn H. Verspoor, 101–123. Amsterdam/Philadelphia: John Benjamins.
- 2007. The Importance of Not Being Earnest: The Feeling Behind Laughter and Humor. Amsterdam/Philadelphia: John Benjamins. ISBN 978-90-272-4152-8.
- 2014. A Grammar of the Seneca Language. UC Publications in Linguistics (Book 149). Berkeley: University of California Press.
- 2018. The Caddo Language: A grammar, texts, and dictionary based on materials collected by the author in Oklahoma between 1960 and 1970. Petoskey, Michigan: Mundart Press.
- 2018. Thought Based Linguistics: How Languages Turn Thoughts Into Sounds. Cambridge University Press. ISBN 9781108431569.
