= Hanni Woodbury =

German-American linguist and anthropologist

Hanni Woodbury is a German-American linguist and anthropologist who specializes in Onondaga and other Iroquoian languages. She was born in Hamburg and moved with her family to the United States after World War II. She has done fieldwork on Onondaga for more than three decades. Her Onondaga–English dictionary—the first dictionary of Onondaga—was described as "monumental". She was awarded one of the Mary Haas Awards in 1994 from the Society for the Study of the Indigenous Languages of the Americas for her work on Onondaga ceremonies.

== Works ==
- Woodbury, Hanni (1979). Noun Incorporation in Onondaga. New Haven: Yale University Press.
- Gibson, John Arthur; Woodbury, Hanni; Henry, Reginald; Webster, Harry; Goldenweiser, Alexander (1992). Concerning the League: The Iroquois League Tradition as Dictated in Onondaga by John Arthur Gibson. Algonquian and Iroquoian Linguistics.
- Woodbury, Hanni (2014) [2003]. Onondaga-English/English-Onondaga Dictionary. Toronto: University of Toronto Press. ISBN 978-1-4426-2872-4.
- Woodbury, Hanni (2018). A Reference Grammar of the Onondaga Language. Toronto: University of Toronto Press. ISBN 978-1-4875-0282-9.
