= Bryan Gick =

American-Canadian Linguist

Bryan Gick is an American-Canadian linguist and researcher in the fields of linguistics, articulatory phonetics, and motor control. Since 1999, he has been a Professor at the University of British Columbia in the Department of Linguistics. He is a fellow of the Royal Society of Canada and a Guggenheim Scholar, and is a senior researcher of Haskins laboratories at Yale University.

Gick has published works in the domain of multi-sensory integration in speech perception and the role of posture in structures underlying fine motor skills (such as the tongue). He has advocated for the integration of embodied cognition into Linguistic subfields such as phonetics and phonology.
