= National Register of Historic Places listings in Washington County, Utah =

Location of Washington County in Utah

This is a list of the National Register of Historic Places listings in Washington County, Utah.

This is intended to be a complete list of the properties and districts on the National Register of Historic Places in Washington County, Utah, United States. Latitude and longitude coordinates are provided for many National Register properties and districts; these locations may be seen together in a map.

There are 88 properties and districts listed on the National Register in the county. Of these, 29 are located within Zion National Park and are described in National Register of Historic Places listings in Zion National Park, and 60 are listed here. One listing appears on both lists due to its geography. Two listings have been removed.

This National Park Service list is complete through NPS recent listings posted August 28, 2026.

== Current listings ==
Besides those included in Zion National Park, the current listings are:

	Name on the Register	Image	Date listed	Location	City or town	Description
1	Wallace Blake House	Wallace Blake House	November 14, 1978 (#78002709)	South of St. George; 37°02′49″N 113°36′15″W	St. George	
2	Bradshaw House-Hotel	Bradshaw House-Hotel	September 26, 1991 (#91001443)	85 S. Main St. 37°10′31″N 113°17′13″W	Hurricane	
3	William F. Butler House	William F. Butler House	July 13, 1984 (#84002433)	168 S. 300 West; 37°06′19″N 113°35′21″W	St. George	
4	Canaan Gap Archaeological District		March 28, 2025 (#100011576)	Address Restricted	Hildale vicinity	
5	Herbert & Lillian Christensen House	Herbert & Lillian Christensen House	December 27, 2019 (#100004812)	980 Zion Park Blvd. 37°11′18″N 113°00′03″W	Springdale	Now a bed and breakfast
6	Robert D. Covington House	Robert D. Covington House	April 20, 1978 (#78002711)	200 N. 200 East; 37°08′05″N 113°30′20″W	Washington	
7	Crawford Irrigation Canal	Crawford Irrigation Canal	July 7, 1987 (#86003732)	Western bank of the Virgin River from 1 mile (1.6 km) north of the Virgin River bridge to the base of the Virgin River Formation and .5 miles (0.80 km) up Oak Creek; 37°12′40″N 112°59′33″W	Springdale	
8	Deseret Telegraph and Post Office	Deseret Telegraph and Post Office	February 23, 1972 (#72001263)	On State Route 9; 37°09′39″N 113°02′40″W	Rockville	
9	Dixie Hillside "D"	Dixie Hillside "D"	May 25, 2022 (#100007768)	West Black Ridge; 37°06′30″N 113°35′52″W	St. George vicinity	
10	Enterprise Meetinghouse		May 14, 1993 (#93000410)	Approximately 24 S. Center St. 37°34′23″N 113°43′16″W	Enterprise	
11	Thomas Forsyth House	Thomas Forsyth House	February 11, 1982 (#82004184)	111 N. Toquerville Boulevard; 37°15′11″N 113°17′06″W	Toquerville	
12	Fort Harmony Site	Fort Harmony Site	November 16, 1979 (#79003493)	East of New Harmony and west of I-15; 37°28′51″N 113°14′34″W	New Harmony	
13	Fort Pearce	Fort Pearce	November 20, 1975 (#75001834)	Warner Valley Rd., 12 miles (19 km) southeast of Washington off Interstate 15; 37°00′28″N 113°24′41″W	Washington	
14	George and Bertha Graff House	George and Bertha Graff House	December 4, 1998 (#98001461)	2865 Santa Clara Dr. 37°07′56″N 113°39′01″W	Santa Clara	
15	Grafton Historic District	Grafton Historic District	September 9, 2010 (#10000732)	Beginning at Hall and Grafton Ditch and the Grafton to Rockville Rd. 37°10′00″N 113°05′06″W	Rockville	
16	Hans George Hafen House	Hans George Hafen House	December 4, 1998 (#98001462)	3003 Santa Clara Dr. 37°07′57″N 113°39′10″W	Santa Clara	
17	Jacob Hamblin House	Jacob Hamblin House	March 11, 1971 (#71000860)	3400 Hamblin Dr. 37°08′00″N 113°39′36″W	Santa Clara	
18	Hurricane Canal	Hurricane Canal	August 29, 1977 (#77001324)	East of Hurricane; 37°10′45″N 113°15′59″W	Hurricane	
19	Hurricane Historic District	Hurricane Historic District	August 4, 1995 (#95000980)	Roughly bounded by 300 South, 200 West, State St. and the Hurricane Canal; 37°10′26″N 113°17′19″W	Hurricane	
20	Hurricane Library-City Hall	Hurricane Library-City Hall	September 26, 1991 (#91001444)	35 W. State St. 37°10′35″N 113°17′17″W	Hurricane	
21	Hurricane-LaVerkin Bridge	Hurricane-LaVerkin Bridge	April 14, 1995 (#95000413)	East of State Route 9 over the Virgin River; 37°11′22″N 113°16′13″W	Hurricane	
22	Samuel and Elizabeth Isom House	Samuel and Elizabeth Isom House	March 4, 1993 (#93000063)	188 S. 100 West; 37°10′26″N 113°17′21″W	Hurricane	
23	James Jepson Jr. House	James Jepson Jr. House	June 22, 2000 (#00000732)	15 E. Jepson St. 37°11′59″N 113°11′08″W	Virgin	
24	Thomas Judd House	Thomas Judd House	January 31, 1978 (#78002710)	76 West Tabernacle Street, rear 37°06′32″N 113°35′04″W	St. George	Originally at 269 S. 200 East, moved in 1986
25	La Verkin Hydroelectric Power Plant		May 25, 2022 (#100007777)	Off South State St. 37°11′50″N 113°16′47″W	La Verkin	Electric Power Plants of Utah MPS
26	Lemuel and Mary Ann Leavitt House	Lemuel and Mary Ann Leavitt House	February 12, 1999 (#99000215)	1408 N. Quail St. 37°07′58″N 113°39′18″W	Santa Clara	
27	Leeds CCC Camp Historic District	Leeds CCC Camp Historic District	March 4, 1993 (#93000062)	96 West Mulberry; 37°14′05″N 113°22′00″W	Leeds	
28	Leeds Tithing Office	Leeds Tithing Office	January 25, 1985 (#85000291)	15 North Main Street; 37°14′11″N 113°21′44″W	Leeds	
29	Main Building of Dixie College	Main Building of Dixie College	June 19, 1980 (#80003988)	86 South Main Street; 37°06′25″N 113°34′58″W	St. George	
30	Mountain Meadows Historic Site	Mountain Meadows Historic Site	August 28, 1975 (#75001833)	7 miles (11 km) south of Enterprise on State Route 18; 37°28′57″N 113°38′10″W	Enterprise	
31	Mountain Meadows Massacre Site	Mountain Meadows Massacre Site	June 23, 2011 (#11000562)	West of State Route 18, approximately 3 miles (4.8 km) north of Central; 37°28′32″N 113°38′37″W	Central vicinity	Comprises approximately 760 acres (3.1 km^{2}) within the 3,000-acre (12 km^{2}) Mountain Meadows Historic Site
32	Naegle Winery	Naegle Winery	February 20, 1980 (#80003990)	110 South Toquer Boulevard; 37°14′55″N 113°17′02″W	Toquerville	
33	Old Washington County Courthouse	Old Washington County Courthouse	September 22, 1970 (#70000634)	85 East 100 North; 37°06′39″N 113°34′50″W	St. George	
34	Pine Valley Chapel and Tithing Office	Pine Valley Chapel and Tithing Office	April 16, 1971 (#71000859)	Main and Grass Valley streets 37°23′39″N 113°30′56″W	Pine Valley	
35	Orson Pratt House	Orson Pratt House	August 11, 1983 (#83003199)	76 West Tabernacle Street; 37°06′31″N 113°35′01″W	St. George	
36	Frederick and Anna Maria Reber House	Frederick and Anna Maria Reber House	December 4, 1998 (#98001448)	2988-2990 Santa Clara Drive; 37°07′59″N 113°39′09″W	Santa Clara	
37	Frederick, Jr., and Mary F. Reber House	Frederick, Jr., and Mary F. Reber House	February 12, 1999 (#99000214)	3334 Hamblin Drive; 37°08′01″N 113°39′32″W	Santa Clara	
38	Rockville Bridge	Rockville Bridge	August 4, 1995 (#95000982)	150 South Bridge Road over the East Fork of the Virgin River; 37°09′30″N 113°02′16″W	Rockville	
39	St. George Central City Historic District		April 6, 2026 (#100012847)	Roughly bounded by Bluff Street (west), 500 South (south), 300 East (east), and Diagonal Street with additional areas north of Diagonal Street and east of 300 East (north). 37°06′23″N 113°35′00″W	St. George	
40	St. George Social Hall	St. George Social Hall	April 3, 1991 (#91000360)	212 North Main Street; 37°06′43″N 113°34′56″W	St. George	
41	St. George Tabernacle	St. George Tabernacle	May 14, 1971 (#71000862)	Junction of Tabernacle and Main streets 37°06′29″N 113°34′58″W	St. George	
42	St. George Temple	St. George Temple	November 7, 1977 (#77001325)	Bounded by 200 East, 300 East, 400 South, and 500 South; 37°06′02″N 113°34′38″W	St. George	
43	Santa Clara Hydroelectric Power Plants Historic District	Santa Clara Hydroelectric Power Plants Historic District	April 21, 1989 (#89000281)	Off State Route 18 on the Santa Clara River; 37°18′25″N 113°42′40″W	Gunlock and Veyo	
44	Santa Clara Relief Society House	Santa Clara Relief Society House	February 2, 1994 (#93001577)	Approximately 3036 West Santa Clara Drive; 37°07′59″N 113°39′10″W	Santa Clara	
45	Santa Clara Tithing Granary	Santa Clara Tithing Granary	December 4, 1998 (#98001460)	3105 Santa Clara Drive; 37°07′58″N 113°39′18″W	Santa Clara	
46	Shem Dam		March 13, 2017 (#100000759)	Address restricted	Ivins vicinity	
47	Southern Paiute Archeological District		June 11, 1982 (#82004185)	Address restricted	Washington	
48	Springdale Hilltop Cemetery		July 15, 2025 (#100012025)	110 Winderland Lane; 37°11′34″N 113°00′07″W	Springdale	
49	Springdale Town Jail		July 14, 2025 (#100012039)	60 Winderland Drive; 37°11′23″N 113°00′01″W	Springdale	
50	Emanuel and Ursella Stanworth House	Emanuel and Ursella Stanworth House	December 17, 1992 (#92001692)	198 South Main Street; 37°10′26″N 113°17′15″W	Hurricane	
51	John Steele House	John Steele House	April 7, 1988 (#88000401)	263 North Toquerville Boulevard; 37°15′20″N 113°17′08″W	Toquerville	
52	Sugarloaf Hillside Sign	Sugarloaf Hillside Sign	August 3, 2023 (#100009209)	Red Hills Pkwy. 37°06′56″N 113°34′47″W	St. George	
53	Toquerville Hall	Toquerville Hall	January 17, 2020 (#100004878)	212 North Toquerville Blvd. 37°15′17″N 113°17′06″W	Toquerville	
54	Washington Cotton Factory	Washington Cotton Factory	April 16, 1971 (#71000864)	385 Telegraph Street; 37°07′45″N 113°30′53″W	Washington	
55	Washington Relief Society Hall	Washington Relief Society Hall	August 27, 1980 (#80003991)	100 West Telegraph Street; 37°07′48″N 113°30′41″W	Washington	
56	Washington School	Washington School	November 23, 1980 (#80003992)	25 East Telegraph Street; 37°07′50″N 113°30′34″W	Washington	Now a museum
57	Wells Fargo and Company Express Building	Wells Fargo and Company Express Building	March 11, 1971 (#71000861)	Wells Fargo Road; 37°15′11″N 113°22′00″W	Silver Reef	
58	Woodward School	Woodward School	November 23, 1980 (#80003989)	100 West and Tabernacle streets 37°06′28″N 113°35′02″W	St. George	
59	Brigham Young Winter Home and Office	Brigham Young Winter Home and Office	February 22, 1971 (#71000863)	Corner of 200 North and 100 West; 37°06′41″N 113°35′06″W	St. George	

== Former listings ==
	Name on the Register	Image	Date listed	Date removed	Location	City or town	Description
1	Old Hurricane High School		April 9, 1986 (#86000752)	April 28, 2005	34 S. 100 West	Hurricane	Demolished in 2004
2	St. George Elementary School		April 1, 1985 (#85000820)	December 29, 2025	120 South 100 West; 37°06′28″N 113°35′06″W	St. George	Demolished in 2001

== See also ==
- National Register of Historic Places listings in Zion National Park
- List of National Historic Landmarks in Utah
- National Register of Historic Places listings in Utah
