= Blake House =

Blake House may refer to:

- Blake House, the town house of Sir William Blake, building now predecessor to Buckingham Palace.

in the United States (by state)

- Blake House (Bentonville, Arkansas), listed on the National Register of Historic Places (NRHP) in Benton County, Arkansas
- Blake Garden (Kensington, California)
- Blake House (Bangor, Maine), listed on the NRHP in Penobscot County, Maine
- James Blake House, Boston, MA, listed on the NRHP in Massachusetts
- John P. and Dora Blake House, Kirkwood, MO, listed on the NRHP in St. Louis County, Missouri
- John Blake House, Maybrook, NY, listed on the NRHP in Orange County, New York
- Blake House (Arden, North Carolina), listed on the NRHP in Buncombe County, North Carolina
- Chairman Blake House, Davidson, NC, listed on the NRHP in Mecklenburg County, North Carolina
- H.G. Blake House, Medina, OH, listed on the NRHP in Medina County, Ohio
- Blake Ranch House, Gustave, SD, listed on the NRHP in Harding County, South Dakota
- Wallace Blake House, St. George, UT, listed on the NRHP in Washington County, Utah
