= Frederick, Jr., and Mary F. Reber House =

- U.S. National Register of Historic Places
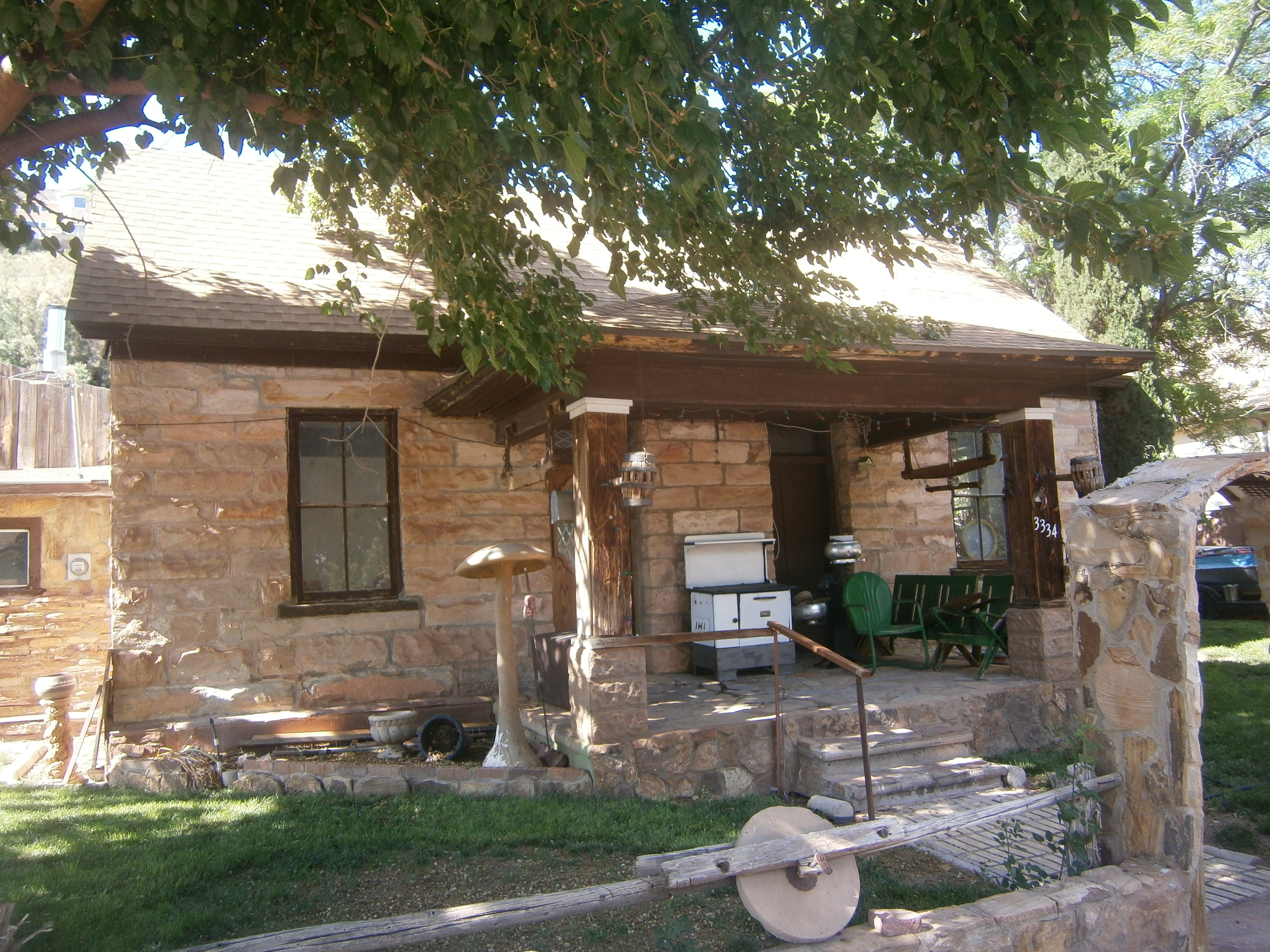
- The house in 2019

- Location within Utah
- Location: 3334 Hamblin Drive, Santa Clara, Utah
- Coordinates: 37°08′01″N 113°39′32″W
- Area: 0.5 acres (0.20 ha)
- Built: 1900
- Built by: Frederick Reber Jr., Mr. Horesly
- Architectural style: Mid 19th Century Revival, Double cell
- MPS: Santa Clara, Utah MPS
- NRHP reference No.: 99000214
- Added to NRHP: February 12, 1999

The Frederick, Jr., and Mary F. Reber House is a historic house in Santa Clara, Utah. It was built in 1900 for Frederick Reber, Jr., an immigrant from Switzerland who converted to the Church of Jesus Christ of Latter-day Saints, and his wife, née Mary Frie. It was deeded to their son Leo in 1954. It has been listed on the National Register of Historic Places since February 12, 1999.
