= Fort Harmony Site =

- U.S. National Register of Historic Places
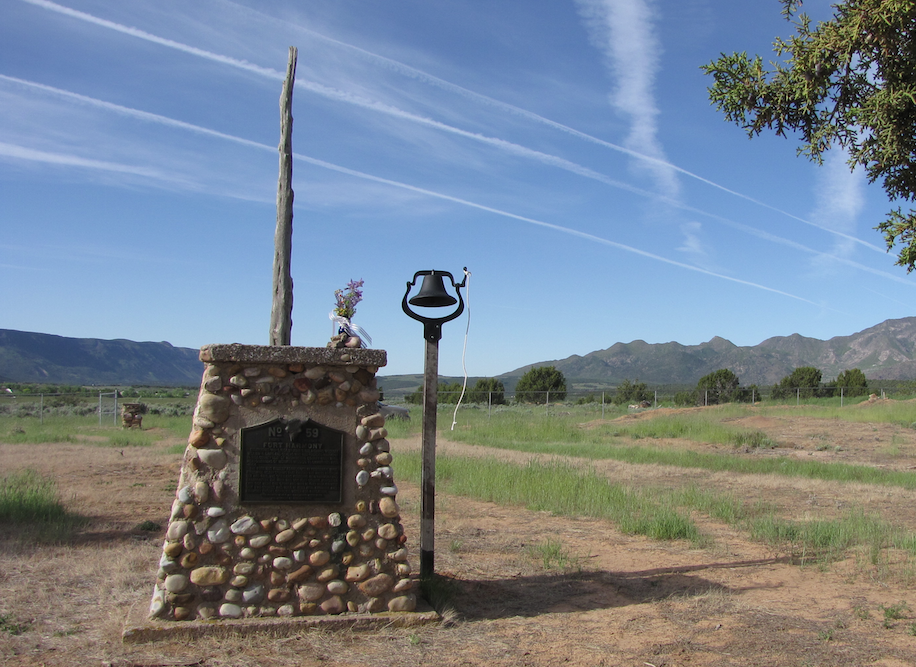
- The monument in 2008

- Location within Utah Location within the United States
- Nearest city: New Harmony, Utah
- Coordinates: 37°28′46″N 113°14′05″W
- Area: 2.5 acres (1.0 ha)
- Built: 1854
- NRHP reference No.: 79003493
- Added to NRHP: November 16, 1979

The Fort Harmony Site is a historic site with a monument in New Harmony, Utah. It was established on May 20, 1854 by Brigham Young, who served as the second president of the Church of Jesus Christ of Latter-day Saints from 1847 to 1877. It was built with adobe, and it served as the home of Mormon settlers like John D. Lee until 1862. The site was later acquired by homesteader Andrew G. Schmutz. A historical marker was later installed by the Daughters of Utah Pioneers. The site has been listed on the National Register of Historic Places since November 16, 1979.

== See also ==
- Fort Pearce (Washington, Utah)
