= Washington School (Washington, Utah) =

- U.S. National Register of Historic Places
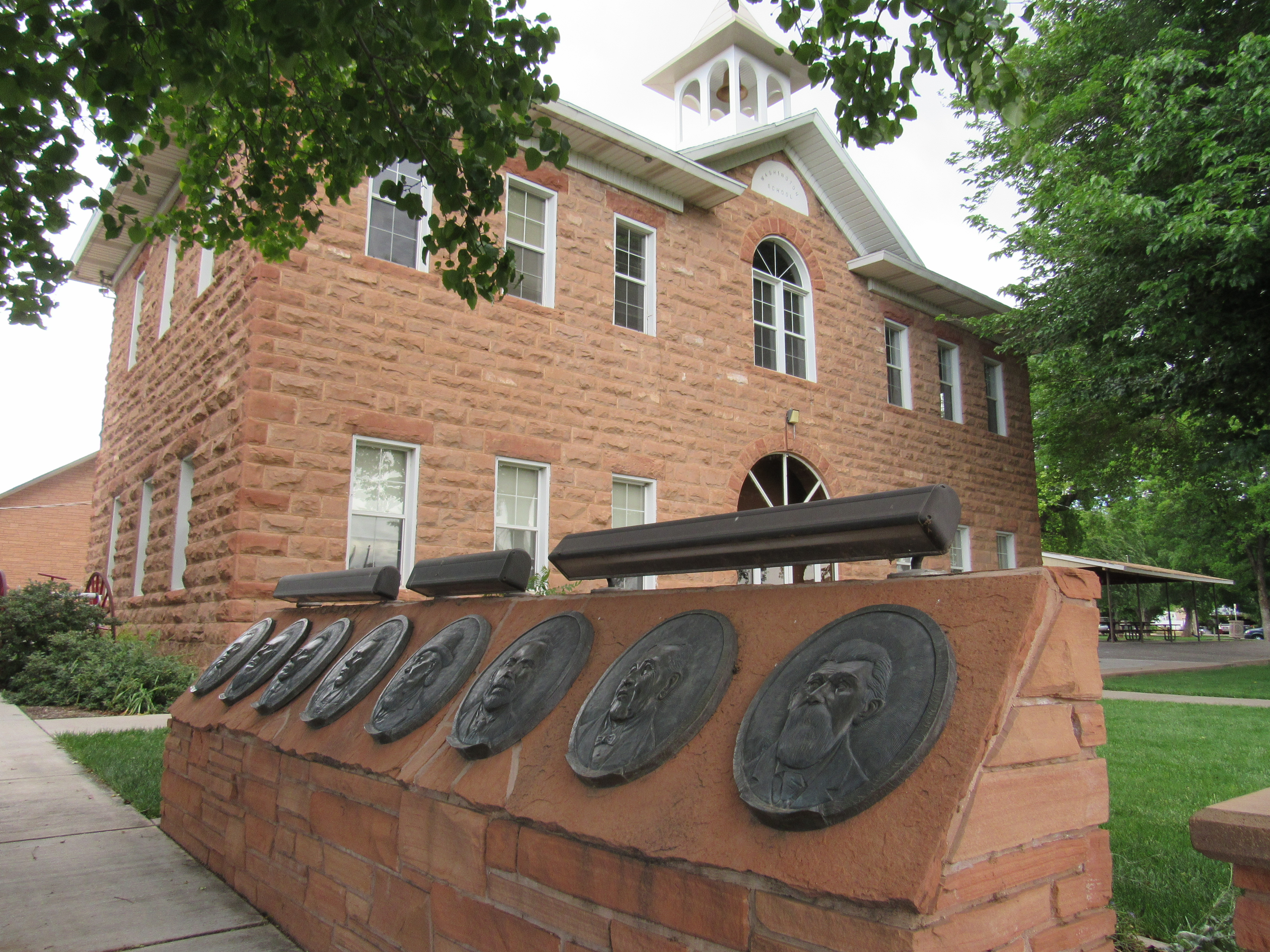
- Washington School building, 2015
- Location: Washington, Utah, United States
- Coordinates: 37°7′50.4″N 113°30′33.8″W
- Built: 1908–1909
- NRHP reference No.: 80003992
- Added to NRHP: November 23, 1980

The Washington School is a historic school building in Washington, Utah. Built from 1908 to 1909, the structure was continuously used as a school until 1976. It was then used for various purposes including as office space by Washington City and was home to Millcreek High School from 1987 to 2001. Since 2003, the Washington City Historical Museum has been located in the building.

The building was listed on the National Register of Historic Places in 1980.

== Description ==
The school building is a two-story structure, built of sandstone. The façade displays a symmetrical seven over seven window piercing, and the roof shape is truncated hip with a central gable dormer. Its style is likened to two other nearby school buildings, the Woodward School and Academy Building.

== History ==
The Board of Trustees of the 9th School District solicited bids for the building's construction in spring 1908. Ira McMullin of nearby Leeds, Utah was the stonemason. In the 1920s, a gymnasium was added to the rear of the building.

By the 1970s, the elementary had outgrown the structure, with students in grades five and six needing to be bused to nearby St. George, Utah for classes. As such, the Washington County School District constructed a new elementary school building in Washington City, which opened at the end of August 1976, allowing the school to move out of the old building. Although, until the final phase of construction of the new building was completed in 1980, some classrooms in the old structure continued to be used by the school district.

In fall 1976, Washington City consolidated their offices into a central location in the east room of the old school building. The city offices remained here until June 1982, when a new city office building was opened. For a time in the mid-1980s, the Grace Baptist Church also utilized a room in the building.

In fall 1982, Washington City agreed to purchase the school building and its surrounding grounds from the Washington County School Board for $95,000 (equivalent to $316,940 in 2025). Plans called for the grounds to be used as a public park and the building as a community center, possibly hosting a library branch and meeting space. The city provided the school district with the first $5,000 payment in April 1983, and per the contract would pay off the balance with annual payments of $9,000 for ten years.

In 1987, the city allowed the school district to open Millcreek Alternative High School, an alternative school, in the historic structure. The city continued to use the main level of the building, while the high school was located on the upper floor. As the school district was making use of parts of the building, it agreed, in 1989, to accept improvements and repairs to the building made by the city in lieu of payments the city owed towards the purchase of the structure. In 1996, during centennial celebrations for Utah's statehood, students and staff from the high school created a mosaic-like mural for the foyer of the building. After a new building for the high school was constructed in St. George, the school moved out of the historic structure following the 2000–2001 school year.

=== Museum ===
As the high school was preparing to move out, the Washington City Historical Society signed a lease with Washington City to use the building, once it was vacated, as a museum. On May 10, 2003, the Washington City Historical Museum was opened in the building. The museum's collection, owned by the Washington City Historical Society, was largely donated to the society by the Howard Smith family.

== Monument Plaza ==
In front of the building is Monument Plaza, a collection of five statues and 50 bronze bas relief portraits of the early settlers of Washington City.

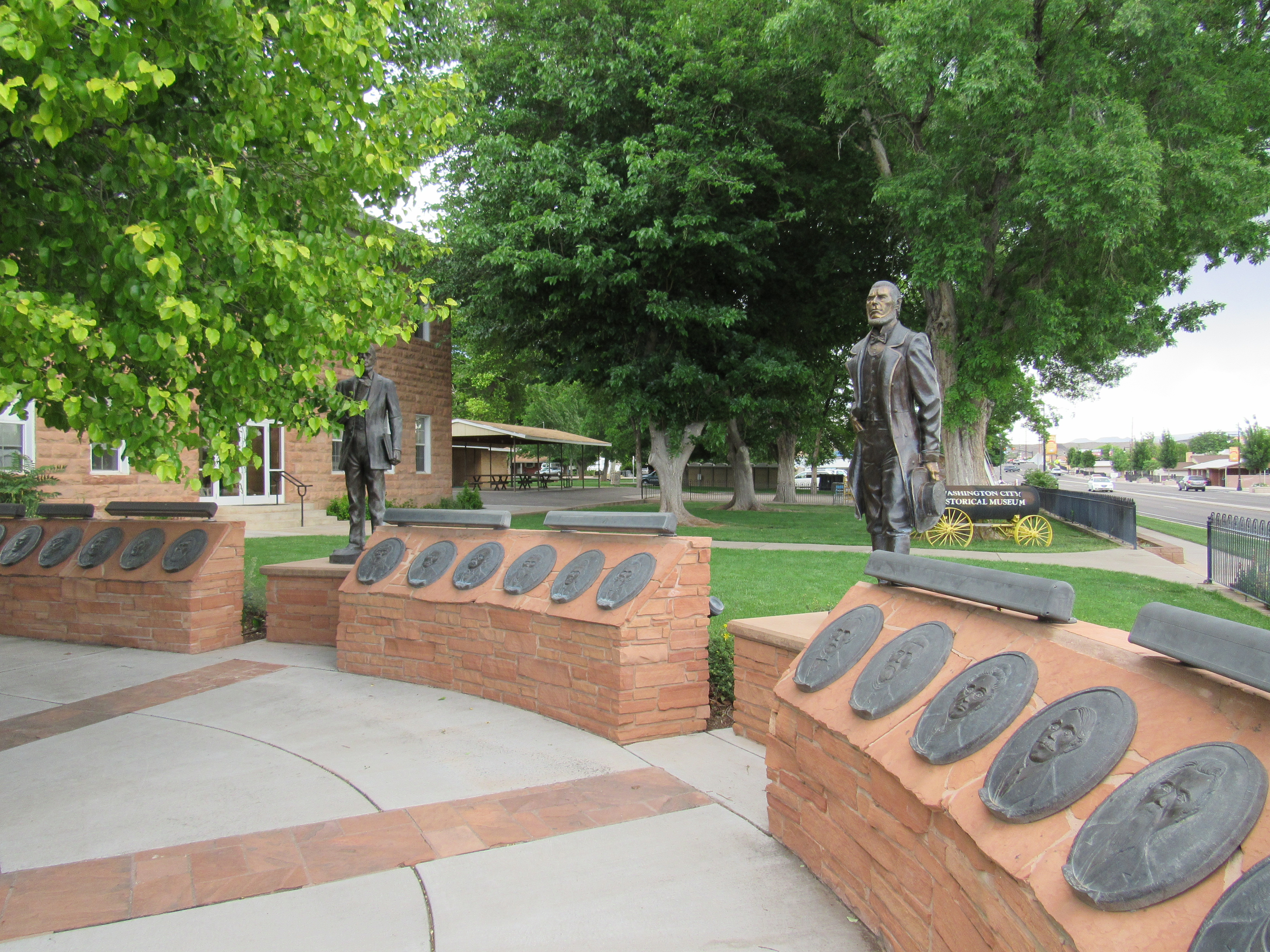
Monument Plaza, 2015

The first four statues and 24 bronze portraits making up the plaza were dedicated on May 10, 2003. The statues are of city founders Samuel J. Adair, Robert D. Covington, John P. Chidester, and Peter Neilson and were created (along with the bas reliefs) by local artist Jerry Anderson. 26 additional bronze portraits were created and then dedicated at the plaza on May 7, 2004.

A fifth statue had been created by Anderson for the plaza, but because its subject was John D. Lee, who was convicted for his role in the 1857 Mountain Meadows Massacre, the city held off on including it as part of the monument in 2003. In 2004, when additional bronze portraits were added, the city had planned to also add the statue of Lee. However, after opposition to the plan, the city council voted to reject the statue. The city then sold the statue back to the artist, who displayed it at his gallery in Silver Reef, Utah. The statue was eventually purchased by descendants of Lee and found its way to the Washington City Historical Society, who, in 2014, asked the city council to reconsider their prior decision and allow the statue to become part of the plaza. The city council again rejected the statue, and instead the statue has been displayed inside the museum at times. In 2023, a statue of Malinda Allison Hunt Kelley Covington, also created by Anderson, was added to the plaza on the pedestal originally meant for Lee's statue.

== See also ==
- National Register of Historic Places listings in Washington County, Utah
- Washington Relief Society Hall
