= Frederick and Anna Maria Reber House =

- U.S. National Register of Historic Places
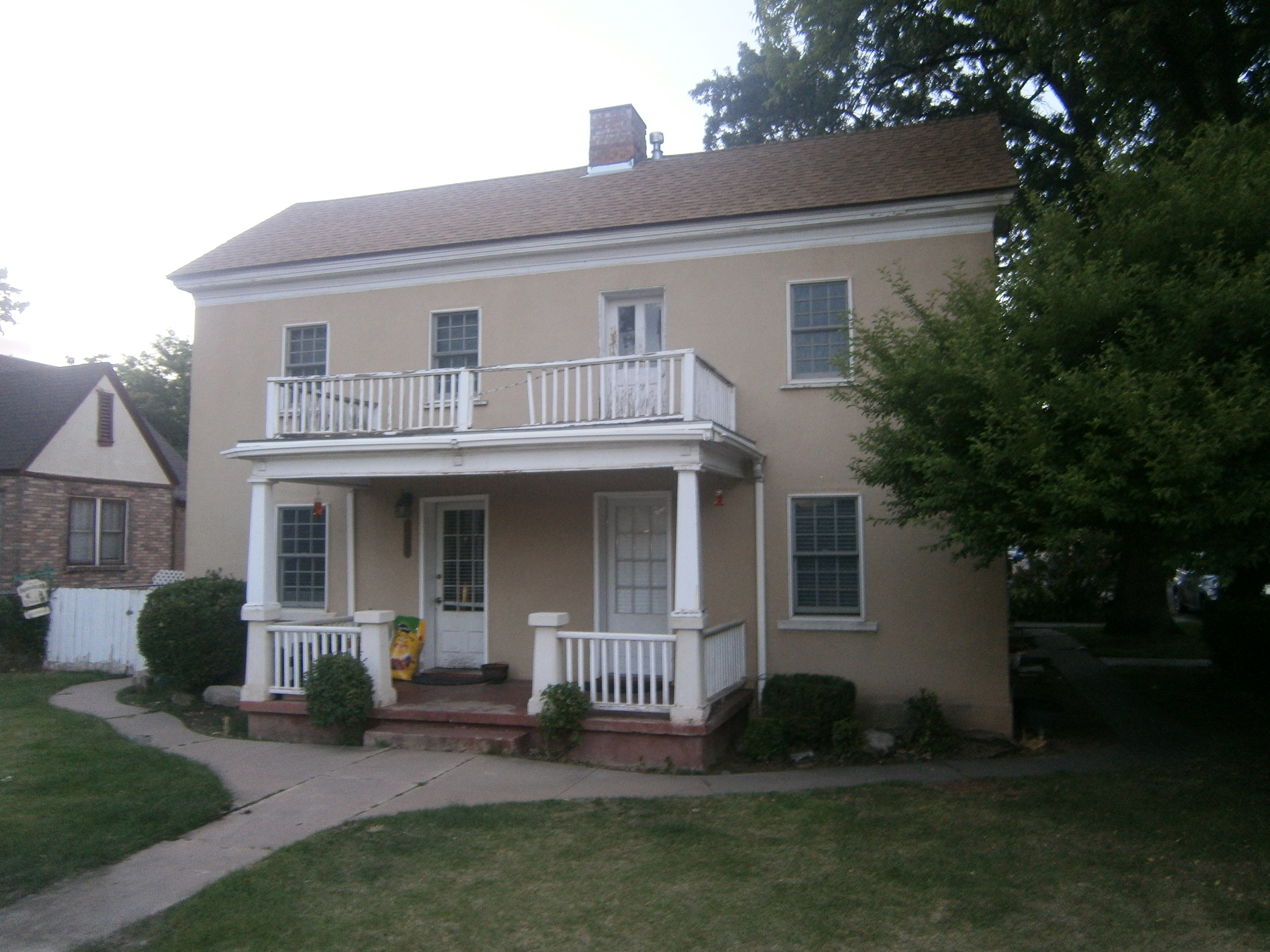
- The house in 2019

- Location within Utah Location within the United States
- Location: 2988-2990 Santa Clara Drive, Santa Clara, Utah
- Coordinates: 37°07′59″N 113°39′09″W
- Area: 0.1 acres (0.040 ha)
- Built: 1870
- Architectural style: Greek Revival, Double-cell
- MPS: Santa Clara, Utah MPS
- NRHP reference No.: 98001448
- Added to NRHP: December 4, 1998

The Frederick and Anna Maria Reber House is a historic two-story house in Santa Clara, Utah. It was built with stucco in 1870, and designed in the Greek Revival style. The Rebers were immigrants from Switzerland who converted to the Church of Jesus Christ of Latter-day Saints before settling in Santa Clara. It has been listed on the National Register of Historic Places since December 4, 1998.
