= George and Bertha Graff House =

- U.S. National Register of Historic Places
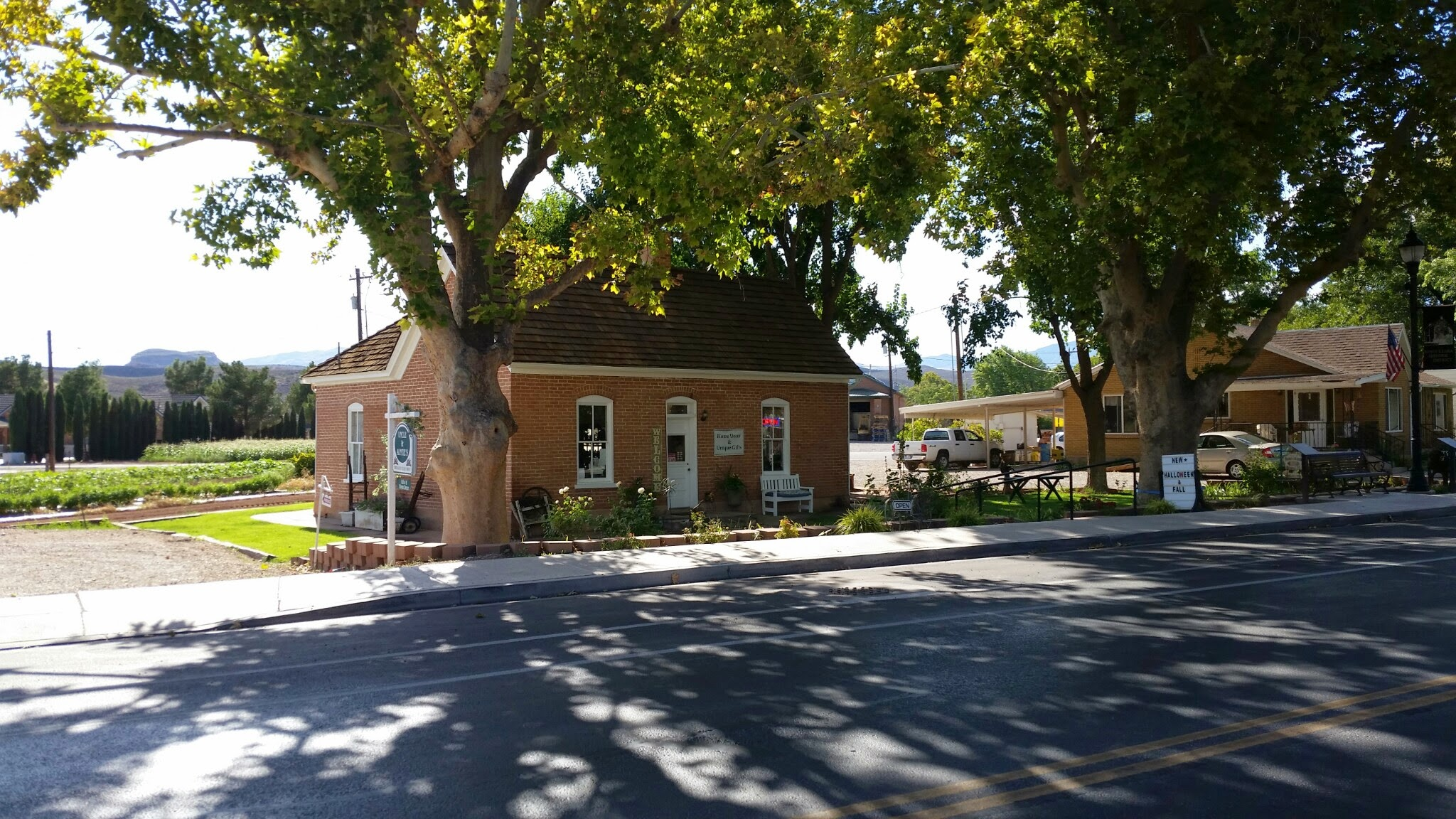
- The house in 2014

- Location within Utah Location within the United States
- Location: 2865 Santa Clara Drive, Santa Clara, Utah
- Coordinates: 37°07′56″N 113°39′01″W
- Area: less than one acre
- Built: 1908
- Built by: George A. Graff
- Architectural style: Mid 19th Century Revival, Hall-parlor
- MPS: Santa Clara, Utah MPS
- NRHP reference No.: 98001461
- Added to NRHP: December 4, 1998

The George and Bertha Graff House is a historic house in Santa Clara, Utah. It was built with adobe in 1908 by George A. Graff, a farmer of Swiss descent. It has been listed on the National Register of Historic Places since December 4, 1998.
