= Covington House =

Covington House may refer to:

- Covington House (Tallahassee, Florida), listed on the National Register of Historic Places (NRHP) in Florida
- Covington House (Richmond, Kentucky), listed on the NRHP in Kentucky
- Covington Institute Teachers' Residence, Springfield, KY, listed on the NRHP in Kentucky
- Covington House (DeSoto, Mississippi), listed on the NRHP in Mississippi
- Robert L. Covington House, Hazlehurst, MS, listed on the NRHP in Mississippi
- Covington Plantation House, Rockingham, NC, listed on the NRHP in North Carolina
- Robert D. Covington House, Washington, UT, listed on the NRHP in Washington
- Covington House (Vancouver, Washington), listed on the NRHP in Washington
