= James Jepson Jr. House =

Historic house in Virgin, Utah, United States

- U.S. National Register of Historic Places
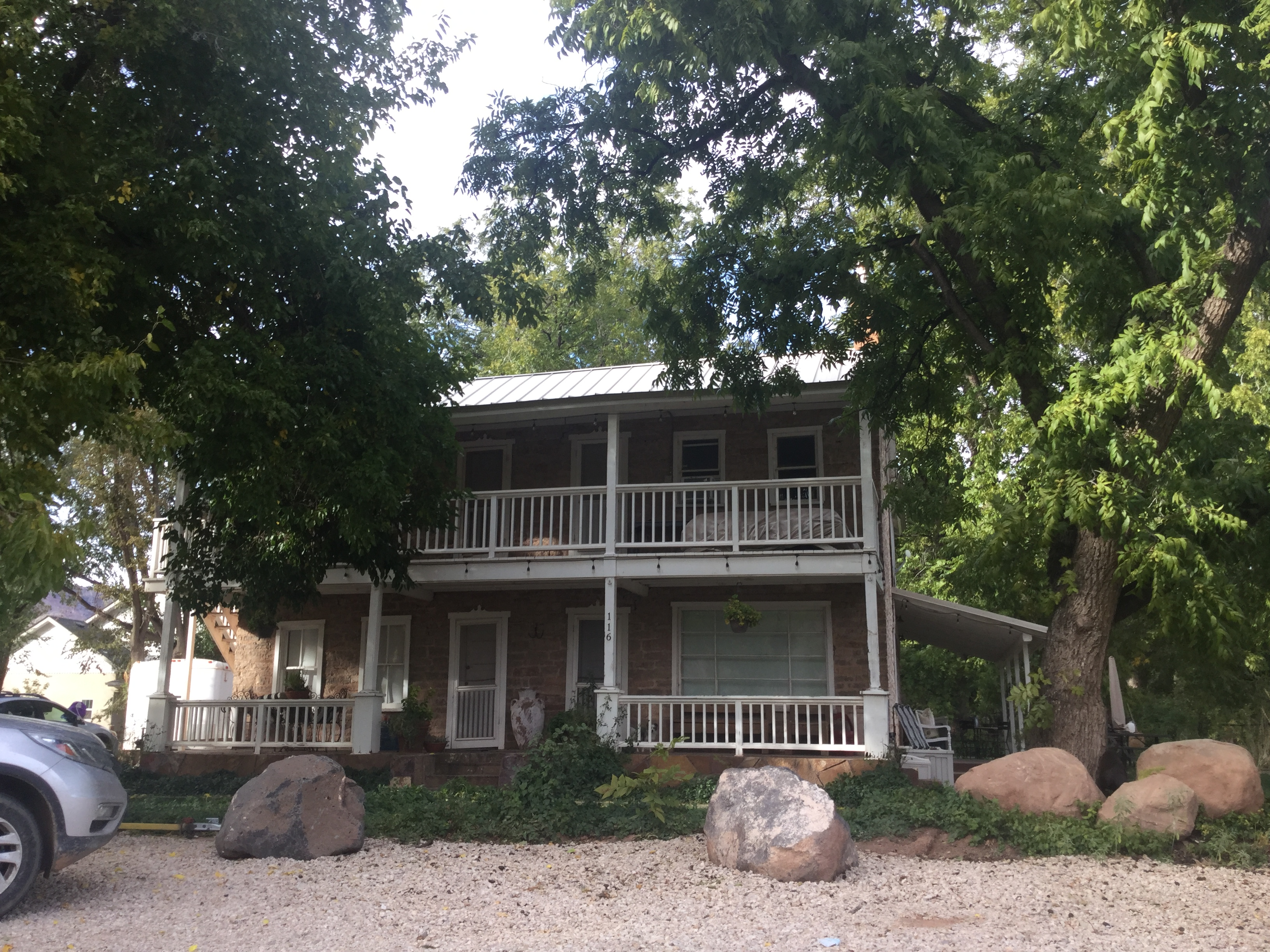
- Photo of the house in October 2021

- Location within Utah Location within the United States
- Location: 15 East Jepson Avenue; Virgin, Utah; United States
- Coordinates: 37°11′59″N 113°11′08″W
- Area: 3.8 acres (1.5 ha)
- Built: 1877
- Architectural style: Double cell
- NRHP reference No.: 00000732
- Added to NRHP: June 22, 2000

The James Jepson Jr. House is a historic two-story house in Virgin, Utah, United States, that is listed on the National Register of Historic Places, (NRHP).

== Description ==
The house is located at 15 East Jepson Avenue and was built with limestone in 1877 by James Jepson Jr., the son of English-born converts to the Church of Jesus Christ of Latter-day Saints. Jepson helped build the St. George Utah Temple, is credited with the inception and construction of the Hurricane Canal, and he later served as a counselor to the bishop of the Virgin Ward like his father. He lived in this house with his wife, née Lucinda Stratton, and their children.

It was listed on the NRHP June 22, 2000.

== See also ==
- National Register of Historic Places listings in Washington County, Utah
