= Orson Pratt House =

- U.S. National Register of Historic Places
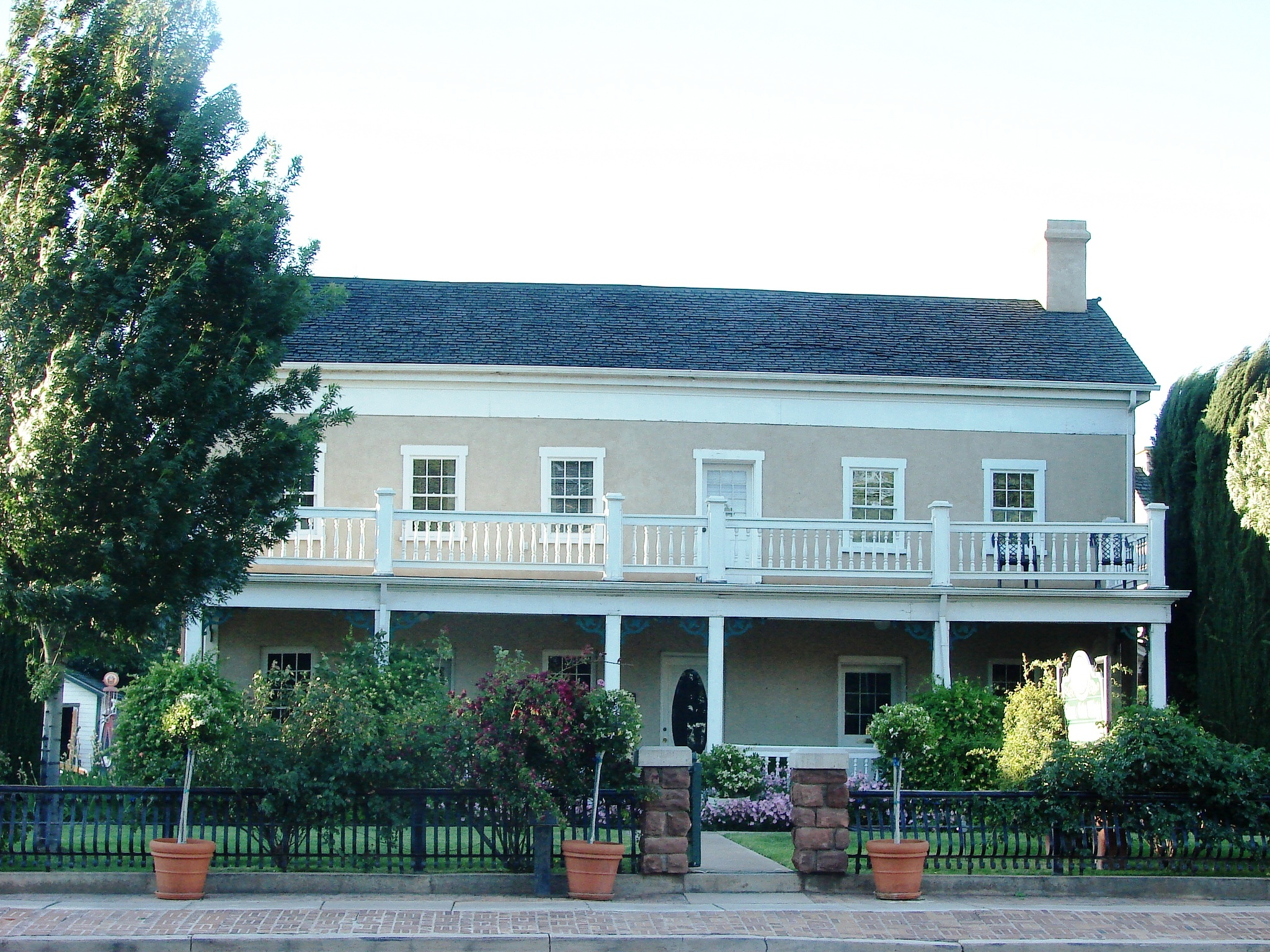
- The house in 2009

- Location within Utah Location within the United States
- Location: 76 West Tabernacle Street, St. George, Utah
- Coordinates: 37°06′31″N 113°35′01″W
- Area: less than one acre
- Built: 1862
- NRHP reference No.: 83003199
- Added to NRHP: August 11, 1983

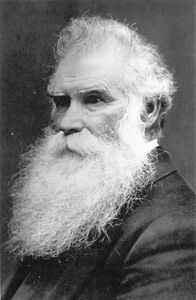
Orson Pratt, the original owner.

The Orson Pratt House is a historic house in St. George, Utah. It was built in 1862, before Utah became a state, for Orson Pratt, a mathematician and an original member of the Quorum of the Twelve Apostles of the Church of Jesus Christ of Latter-day Saints. The house was acquired by Richard Bentley in 1864. It has been listed on the National Register of Historic Places since August 11, 1983.
