= Thomas Judd House =

Historic place in Utah, United States

- U.S. National Register of Historic Places
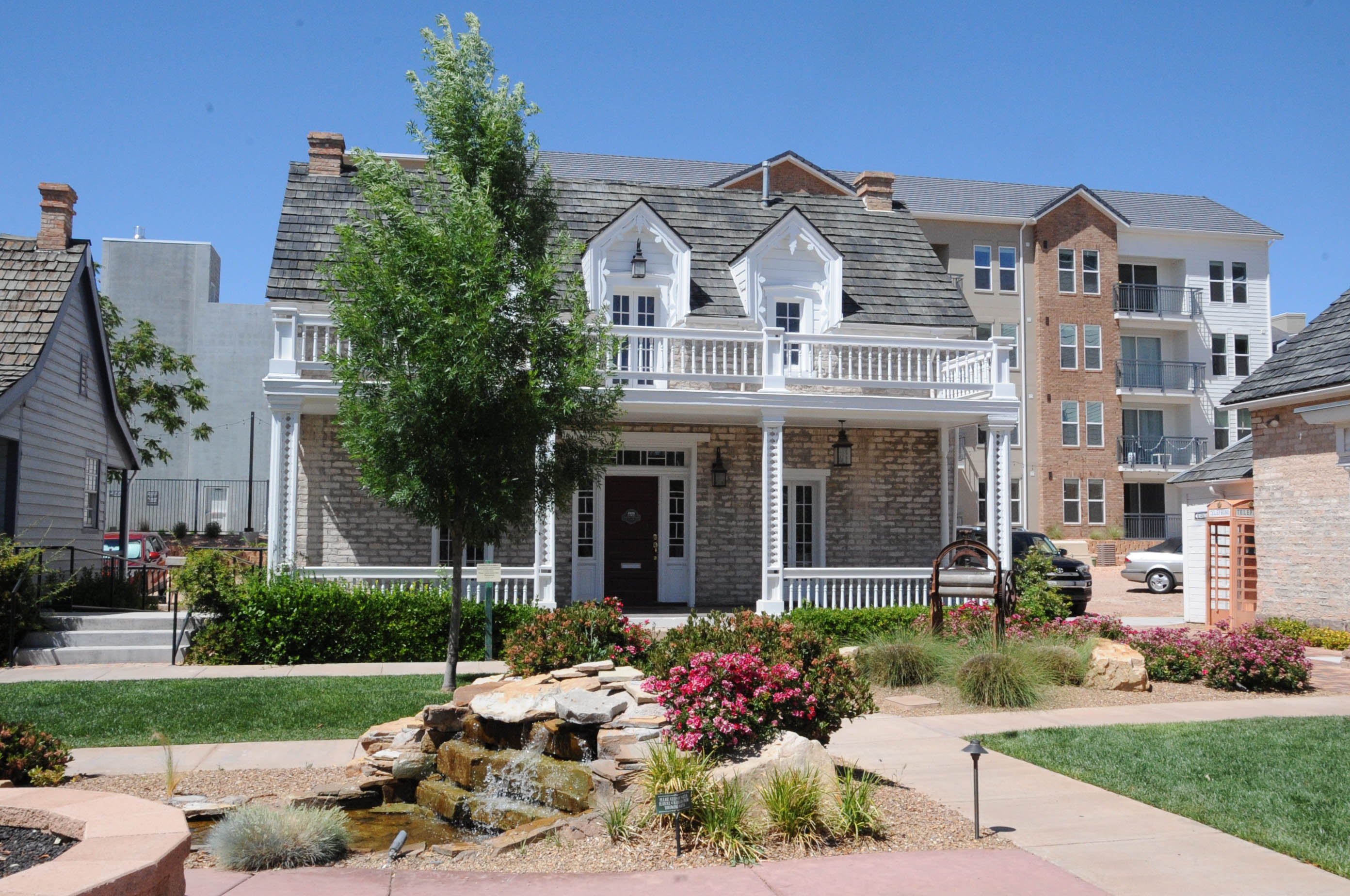

- Location within Utah Location within the United States
- Location: 76 West Tabernacle Street rear, St. George, Utah
- Coordinates: 37°06′32″N 113°35′04.5″W
- Area: 1 acre (0.40 ha)
- Built: 1876
- Built by: Thomas Judd
- Architectural style: Dixie Dormer
- NRHP reference No.: 78002710
- Added to NRHP: January 31, 1978

The Thomas Judd House is a historic house in St. George, Utah. It was built in 1876 for Thomas Judd, an immigrant from England who converted to the Church of Jesus Christ of Latter-day Saints in 1864 and settled in Southern Utah shortly after. Judd initially worked as the clerk of the Southern Utah Tithing Office, and he co-founded Woolley, Lund and Judd with Edwin Gordon Woolley and Robert C. Lund in October 1875. Judd returned to England as a missionary from 1876 to 1878, and he served as the bishop of the St. George First Ward from 1879 to 1896. The house was acquired by George E. Miles, another immigrant from England and convert to the LDS Church, in 1900. It has been listed on the National Register of Historic Places since January 31, 1978.

The house was scheduled for demolition in 1986, but was saved by being moved in several pieces, from its original location at 269 South 200 East to an empty lot. The move severely damaged the house, but in 1991 it was restored. Now known as Green Hedge Manor, it sits at the rear of the property of Green Gate Village, at 76 West Tabernacle Street.
