= Washington Relief Society Hall =

- U.S. National Register of Historic Places
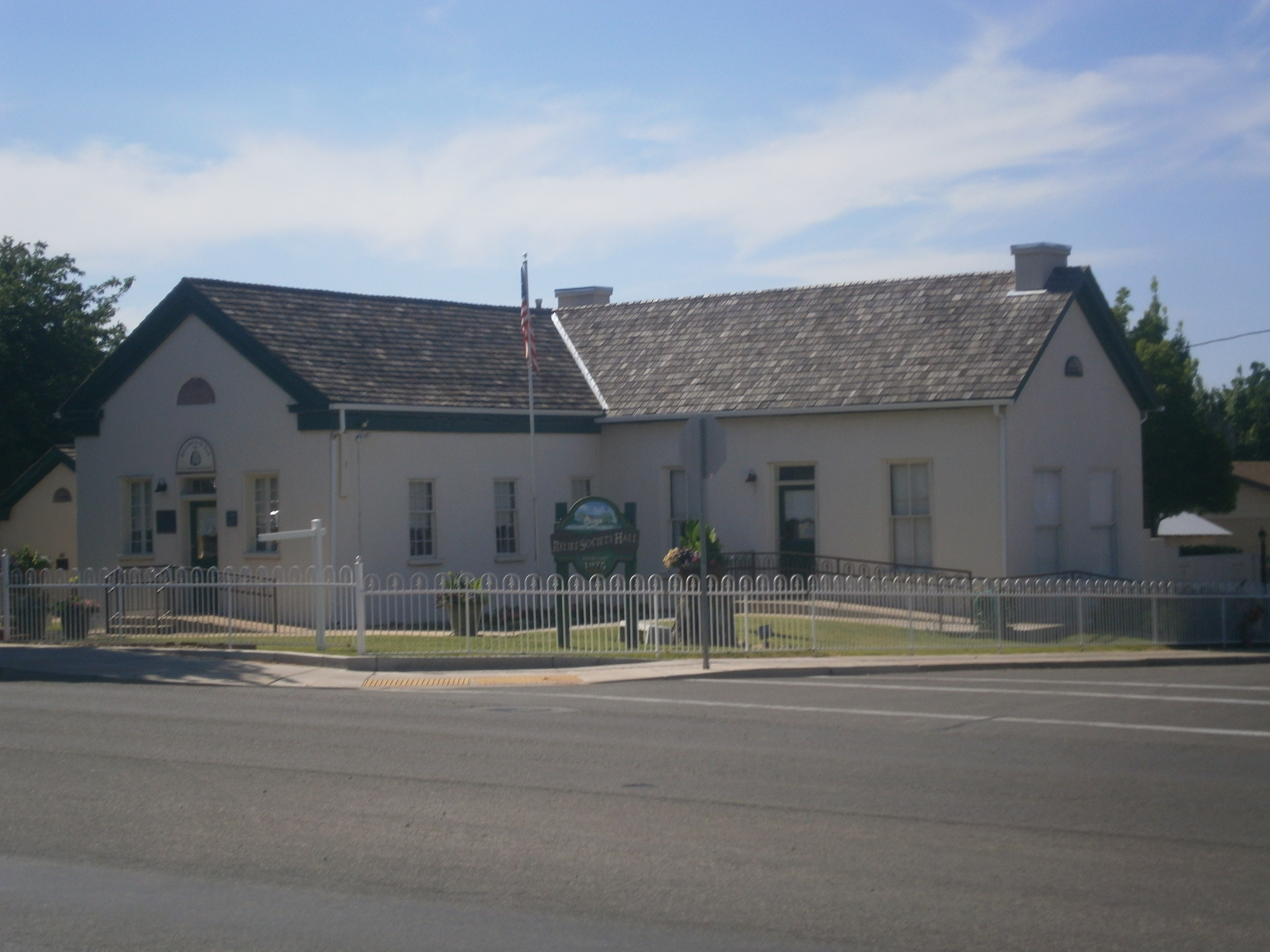
- The building in 2019

- Location within Utah Location within the United States
- Location: 100 West and Telegraph Streets, Washington, Utah
- Coordinates: 37°07′48″N 113°30′58″W
- Area: 2 acres (0.81 ha)
- Built: 1875
- Architectural style: Greek Revival
- NRHP reference No.: 80003991
- Added to NRHP: August 27, 1980

The Washington Relief Society Hall is a historic building in Washington, Utah. It was built as an adobe building in 1875 for the local chapter of the Relief Society of the Church of Jesus Christ of Latter-day Saints, and designed in the Greek Revival style. It was expanded with a west wing in 1904, and stuccoed. It has been listed on the National Register of Historic Places since August 27, 1980.
