= Hans George Hafen House =

- U.S. National Register of Historic Places
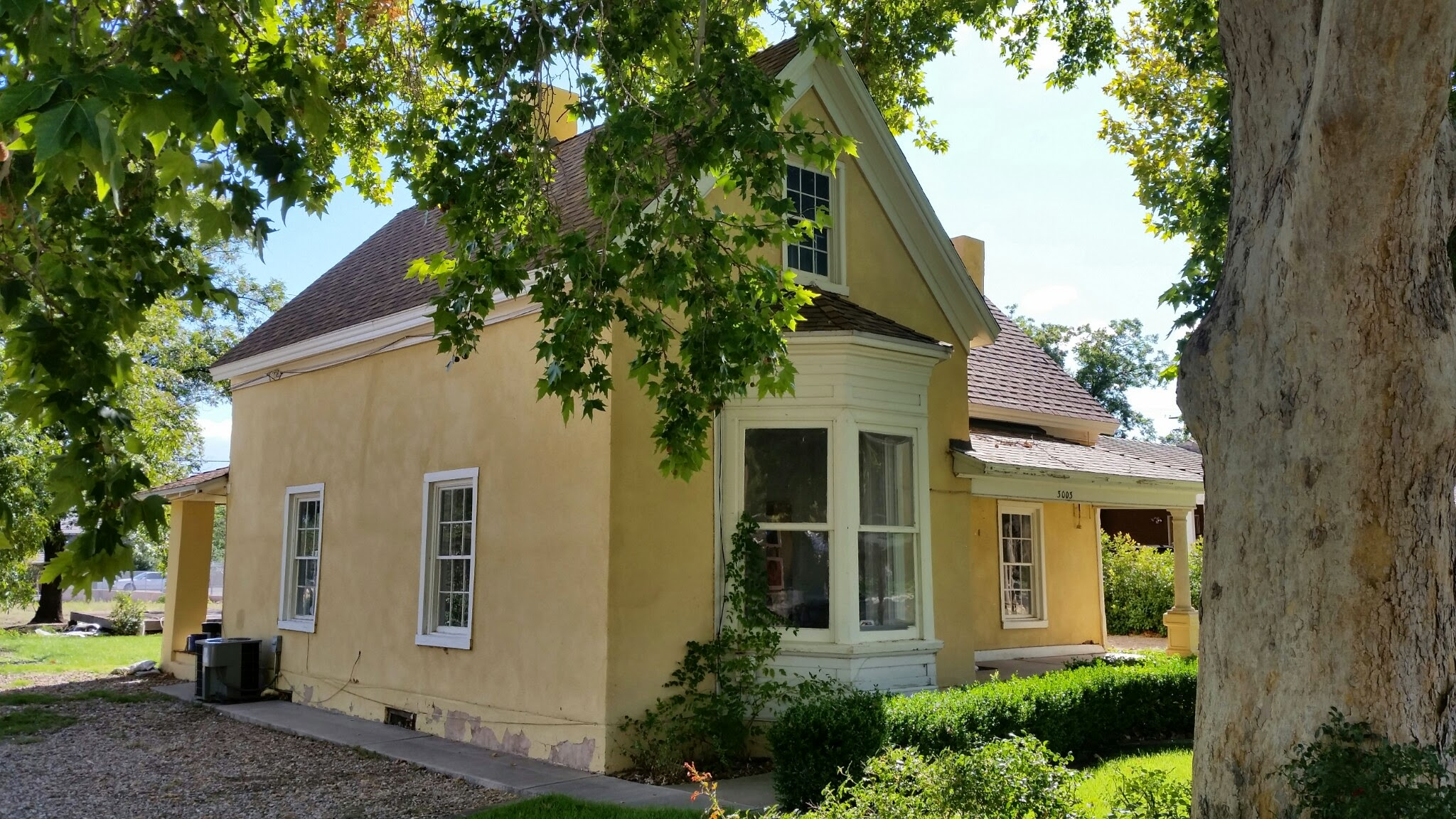

- Location within Utah Location within the United States
- Location: 3003 Santa Clara Dr., Santa Clara, Utah
- Coordinates: 37°07′57″N 113°39′10″W
- Area: 0.8 acres (0.32 ha)
- Built: 1862
- Built by: Hafen, Hans George
- Architectural style: Late Victorian, Cross wing
- MPS: Santa Clara, Utah MPS
- NRHP reference No.: 98001462
- Added to NRHP: December 4, 1998

The Hans George Hafen House, at 3003 Santa Clara Dr. in Santa Clara, Utah, was built in 1862.

It was listed on the National Register of Historic Places in 1998.

It is significant as a legacy of the "Cotton Mission" which brought many Swiss immigrant families to the area. The Swiss had knowledge of grape-growing which was expected to do well, along with cotton, in the area's warm climate. The Hafen family were early Swiss immigrants who "became an important family in the colonization of Santa Clara. The original section of the house is possibly one of the few buildings remaining from the original Swiss settlement period, and the additions the house received over the ensuing decades symbolize the rise in prosperity of the Hafen family in Santa Clara."

John Hafen was born April 19, 1803, in Scherzingen, Thurgau, Switzerland; his wife Maria Magdelena (surname unknown) was born December 27, 1804, in the same village; they were married March 3, 1835. After conversion by Mormon missionaries in Switzerland in 1860 they immigrated to the U.S. in 1861, came to Salt Lake City, and then made the further 300 mile trek to Santa Clara in late 1861.

It is a one-and-a-half-story Victorian Eclectic cross wing house, which was built by Hans George Hafen, probably originally as a single-cell adobe house. It is built upon a stone foundation. It was probably in the 1890s when it was expanded into a cross wing plan building. Further additions came in the early 20th century.

A second contributing building is a brick single-car garage.
