= William F. Butler House =

- U.S. National Register of Historic Places
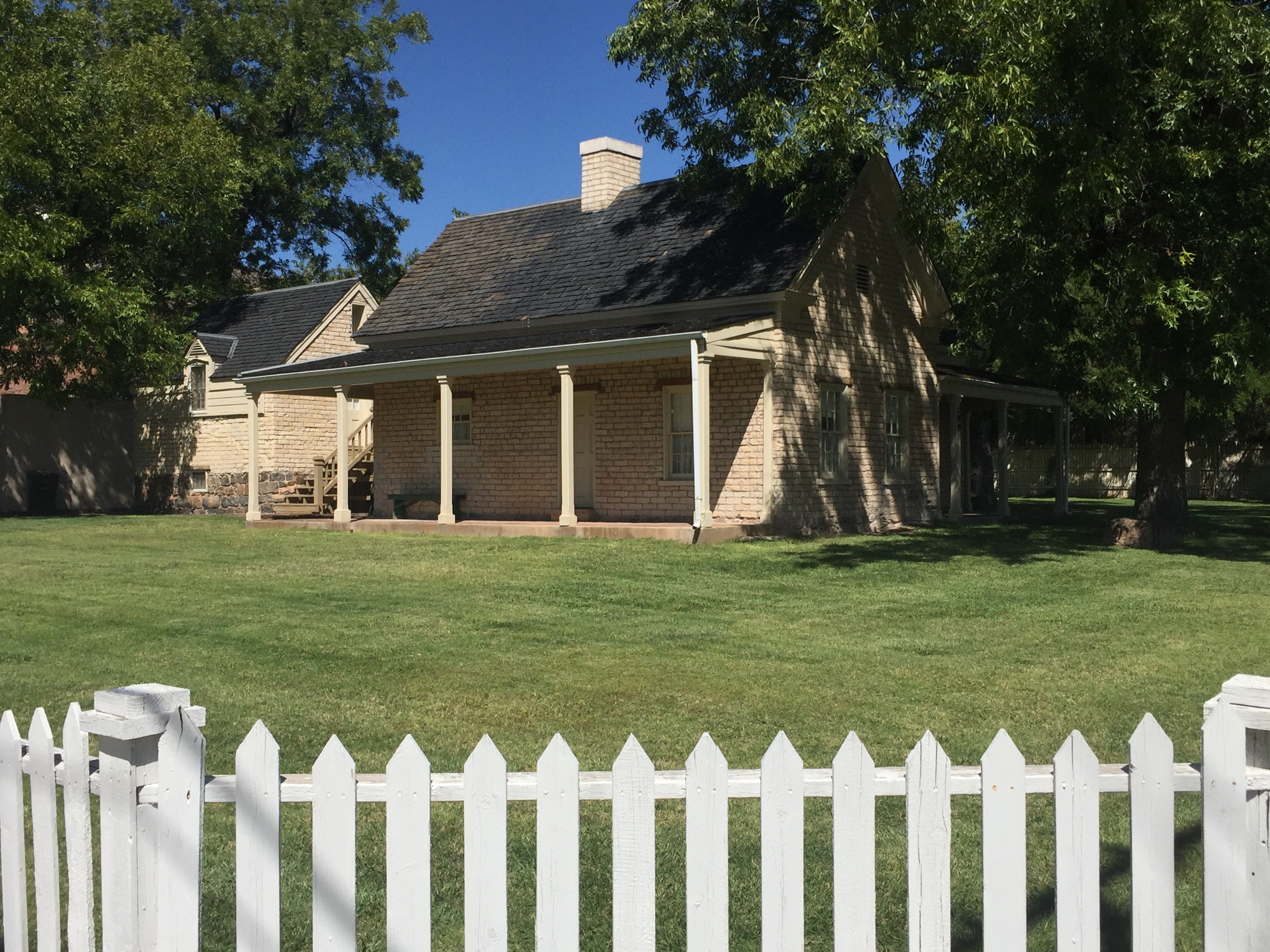
- The house in 2016

- Location within Utah Location within the United States
- Location: 168 South 300 West, St. George, Utah
- Coordinates: 37°06′19″N 113°35′21″W
- Area: less than one acre
- Built: 1865
- Architectural style: Late Victorian
- NRHP reference No.: 84002433
- Added to NRHP: July 13, 1984

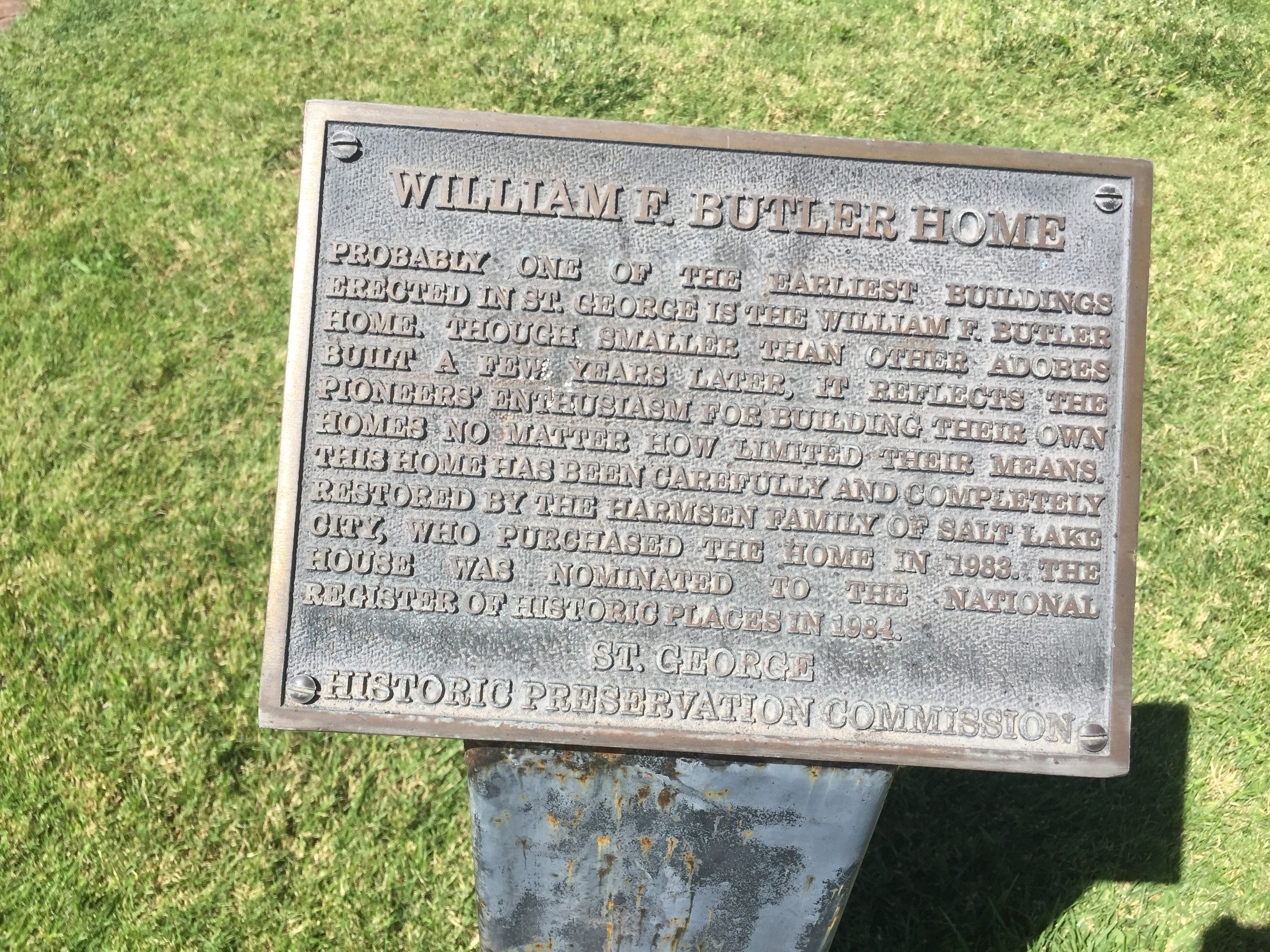
Historical plaque.

The William F. Butler House is a historic house in St. George, Utah, United States. It was built as an adobe house in 1865 by William Franklin Butler, an early convert to the Church of Jesus Christ of Latter-day Saints. Butler first settled Palmyra, Utah with other Mormon converts in 1852 before moving to Spanish Fork, Utah, where he became a council member. In 1861, after President Brigham Young had asked them to, Butler moved to Southern Utah with more than 300 Mormon families and he became one of the first settlers of St. George. This house was built shortly after, and Franklin lived here with his two wives and many children. It was acquired and expanded by Henry G. Bryner, an immigrant from Switzerland and a Mormon convert, in 1886. It has been listed on the National Register of Historic Places since July 13, 1984.
