= Elephant Arch =

Landform in Washington, Utah

Elephant arch
- Rock arch
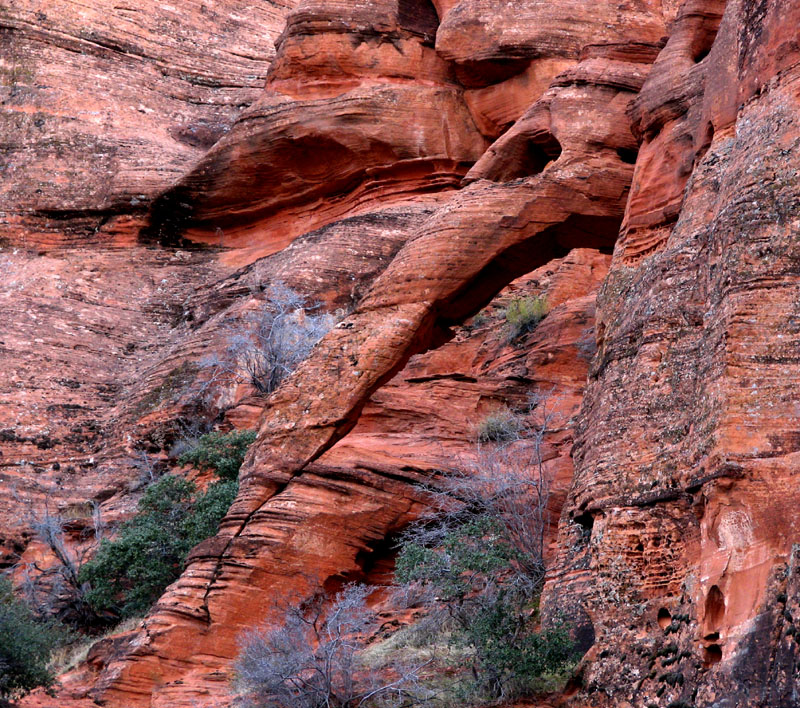
- View of the Arch

- Location in Utah
- Coordinates: 37°10′37″N 113°29′44″W
- Location: Red Cliffs National Conservation Area, Utah

Dimensions
  - Height: 7 ft (2.1 m)
- Elevation: 3,294 ft (1,004 m)

Elephant Arch is a small natural sandstone arch in the Red Cliffs National Conservation Area and Red Cliffs Desert Reserve in northern Washington, Utah, United States.

The arch, which resembles the trunk and eye of an elephant, is part way up a hillside at the end of a dirt hiking trail. The arch has not yet been officially named by the United States Geological Survey.
