= Fort Pearce (Washington, Utah) =

- U.S. National Register of Historic Places
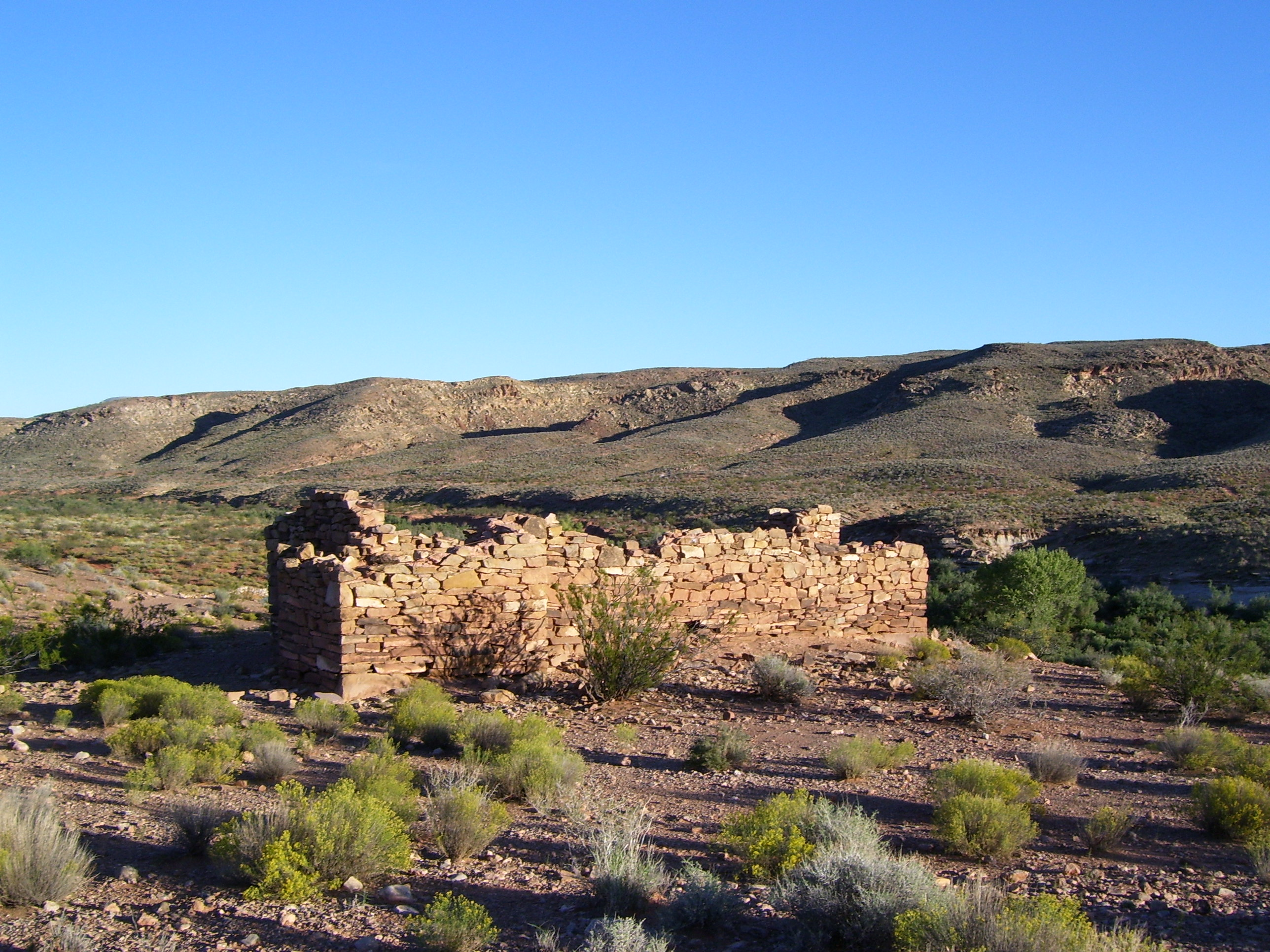
- Fort Pearce ruins, September 2014

- Location within Utah Location within the United States
- Nearest city: Washington, Utah
- Coordinates: 37°00′28″N 113°24′41″W
- Area: 10 acres (4.0 ha)
- Built: 1866
- NRHP reference No.: 75001834
- Added to NRHP: November 20, 1975

Fort Pearce is a former fort established in Washington County, Utah, United States (before Utah became a state), that is listed on the National Register of Historic Places (NRHP). Built in the 19th century, it is located roughly ten miles from St. George's city center, near the border with Mohave County, Arizona, alongside Fort Pearce Wash, an intermittent tributary of the Virgin River named after the fort.

== Description ==
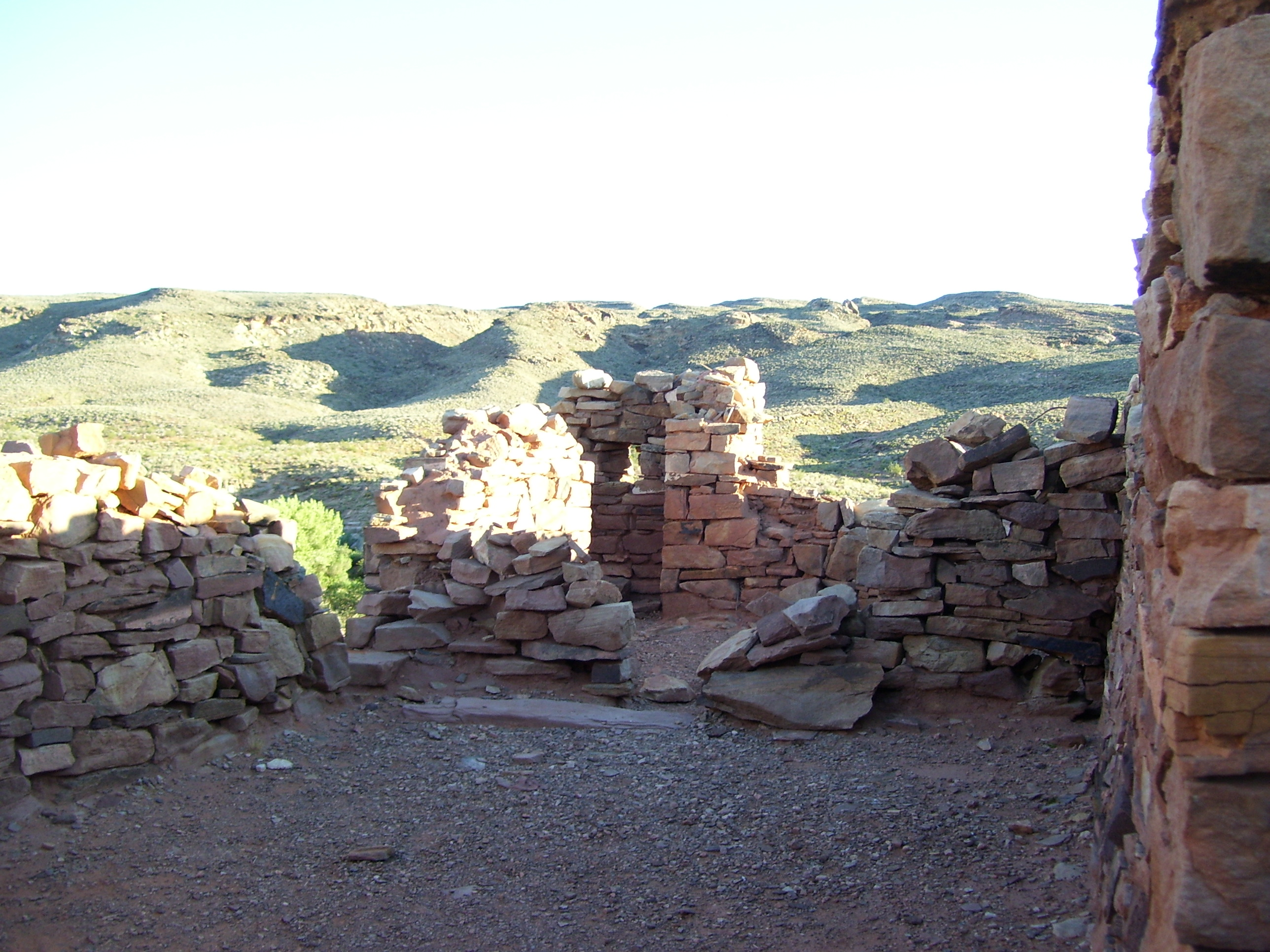
Interior view of Fort Pierce, September 2014

The fort was built by settlers of The Church of Jesus Christ of Latter-day Saints to protect themselves from Navajo Native Americans in the midst of the Black Hawk War of 1865–1872. Initial construction began on December 4, 1866, and was done by six men. It was expanded with a corral built by nineteen men, including Charles L. Walker, in 1869. The fort was named in honor of Captain John David Lafayette Pearce. The ruins have been listed on the National Register of Historic Places since November 20, 1975. No battle was ever fought at the fort.

== See also ==
- National Register of Historic Places listings in Washington County, Utah
