= Robert L. Shepherd Desert Arboretum =

Desert arboretum in Santa Clara, Utah

Coordinates: 37°08′11″N 113°38′26″W

Santa Clara City Arboretum
- Interactive map of Santa Clara City Arboretum
- Type: Desert arboretum
- Location: Santa Clara, Utah

The Robert L. Shepherd Desert Arboretum, properly known as the Santa Clara City Arboretum is a desert arboretum located in Santa Clara, Utah, United States. It was established by Robert L. Shepherd, local artist. The arboretum includes interpretive paths around lava flows and through the desert.

As of 2012, the arboretum is closed to the public and is undergoing restoration after a series of wildfires. Non-native tamarisk trees had taken over the riparian area along the Santa Clara River and had choked out the native vegetation and then burned. The city is working with volunteer crews to eradicate the tamarisk trees and restore the riparian area.

== See also ==
- List of botanical gardens in the United States
