= Santa Clara Relief Society House =

- U.S. National Register of Historic Places
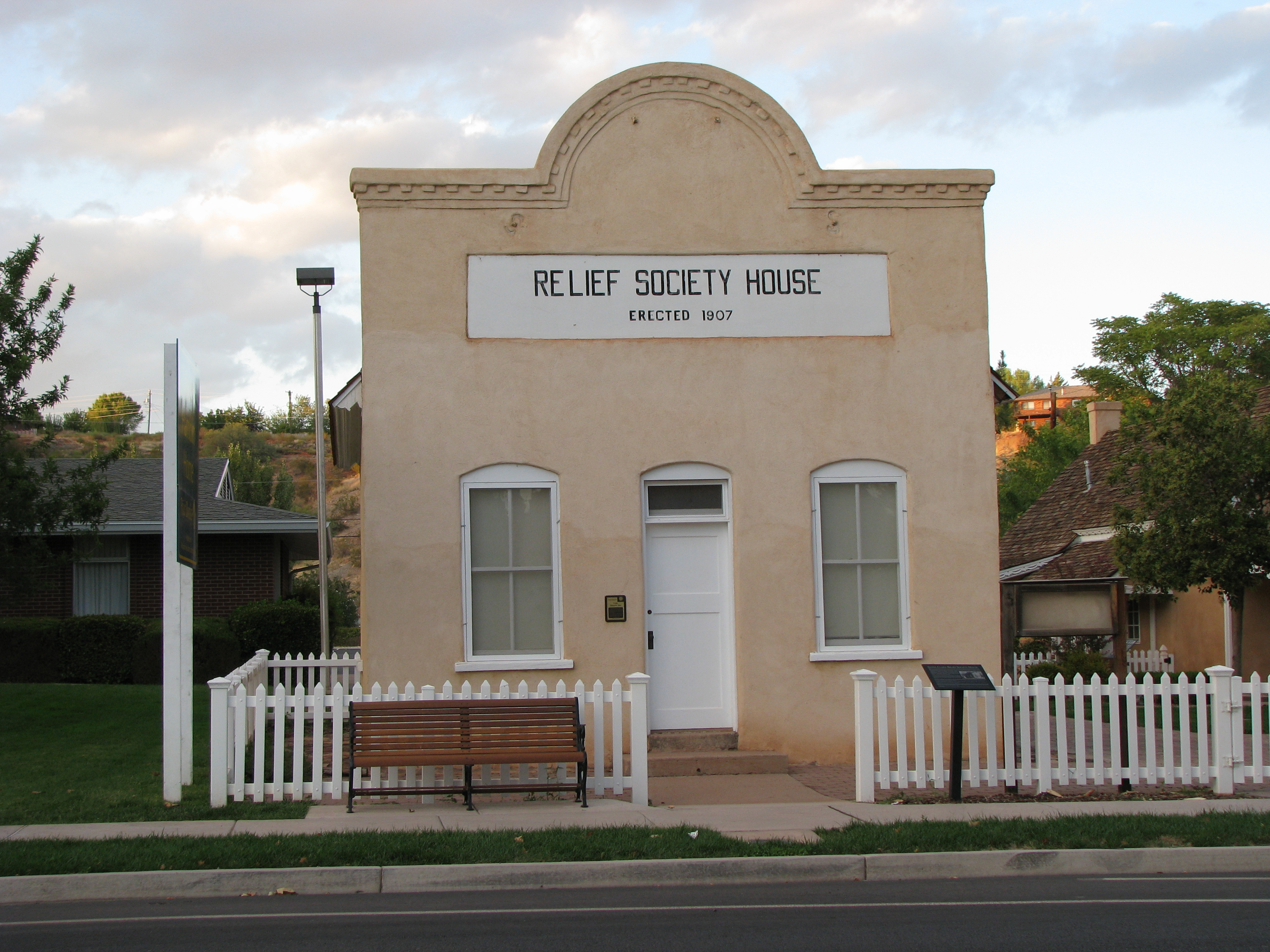
- The building in 2008

- Location within Utah Location within the United States
- Location: Approximately 3036 West Santa Clara Drive, Santa Clara, Utah
- Coordinates: 37°07′59″N 113°39′10″W
- Area: less than one acre
- Built: 1908
- Architectural style: Late Victorian
- MPS: Mormon Church Buildings in Utah MPS
- NRHP reference No.: 93001577
- Added to NRHP: February 2, 1994

The Santa Clara Relief Society House is a historic house in Santa Clara, Utah. It was built in 1908 for the local chapter of the Relief Society of the Church of Jesus Christ of Latter-day Saints, and it was designed in the Late Victorian style. It has been listed on the National Register of Historic Places since February 2, 1994.
