= Washington Cotton Factory =

- U.S. National Register of Historic Places
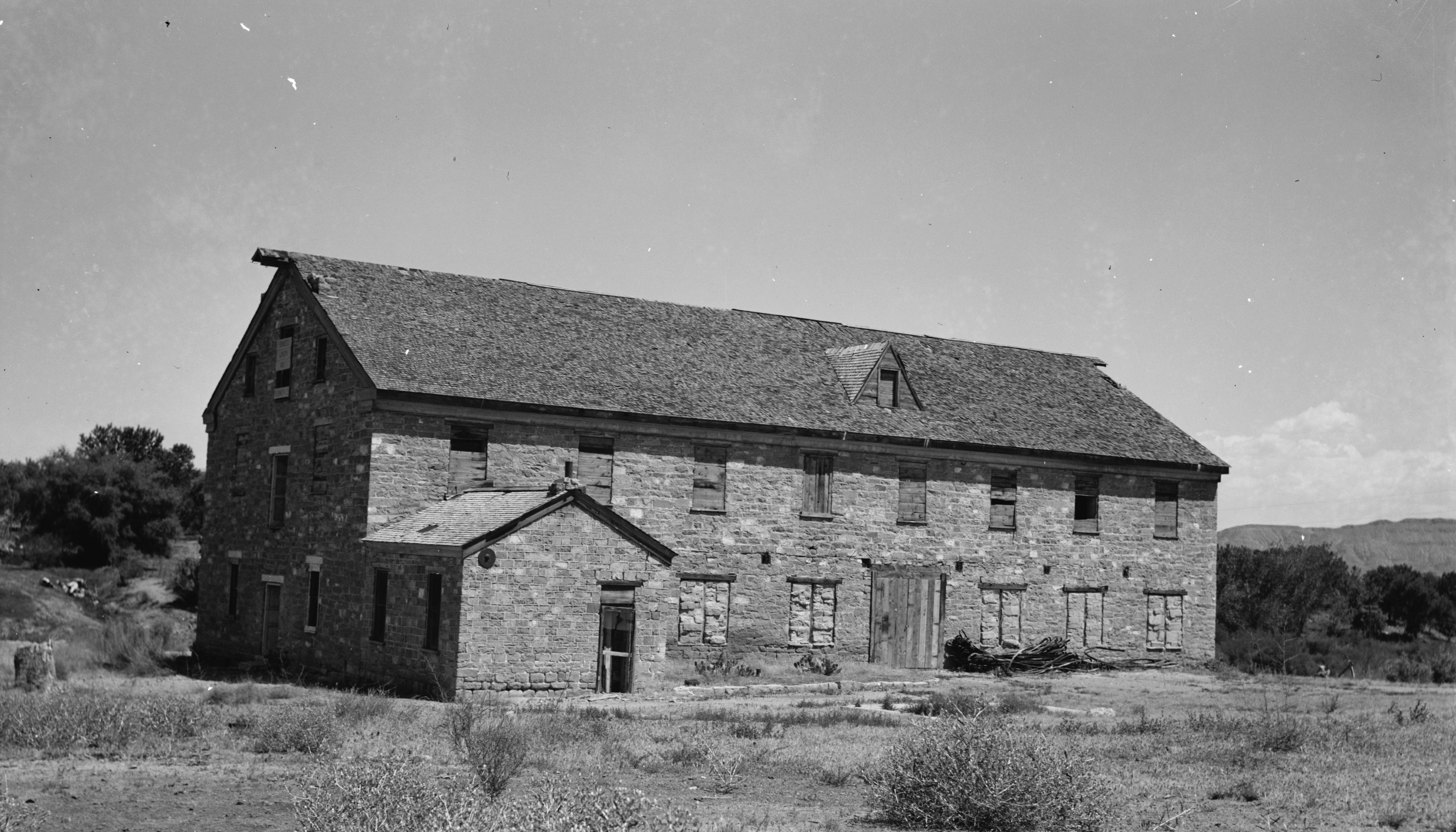
- The Washington Cotton Factory in 1940

- Location within Utah Location within the United States
- Location: On U.S. 91 (Frontage Rd. West), Washington, Utah
- Coordinates: 37°7′45″N 113°30′53″W
- Area: 7 acres (2.8 ha)
- Built: 1867
- Architect: Harmon, Appleton
- NRHP reference No.: 71000864
- Added to NRHP: April 16, 1971

The Washington Cotton Factory was built in 1865–67 on Mill Creek near Washington, Utah by Mormon settlers to process locally grown cotton for use by the settlers. The region of the Virgin River valley became known among Mormons as the "Cotton Mission," a project envisioned by Brigham Young to establish Mormon self-sufficiency.

The mill encountered difficulties in finding a reliable supply of raw cotton and suffered from an erratic water flow. It operated on and off until 1898, when it was permanently closed. It was subsequently used as a warehouse.

The sandstone building was initially completed with one story. Two more stories were added by 1870 to meet demand. A reservoir near the mill could provide ten hours of operation from fourteen hours of stored water.

The Washington Cotton Factory was listed on the National Register of Historic Places on April 16, 1971.
