= Hurricane Canal =

- U.S. National Register of Historic Places
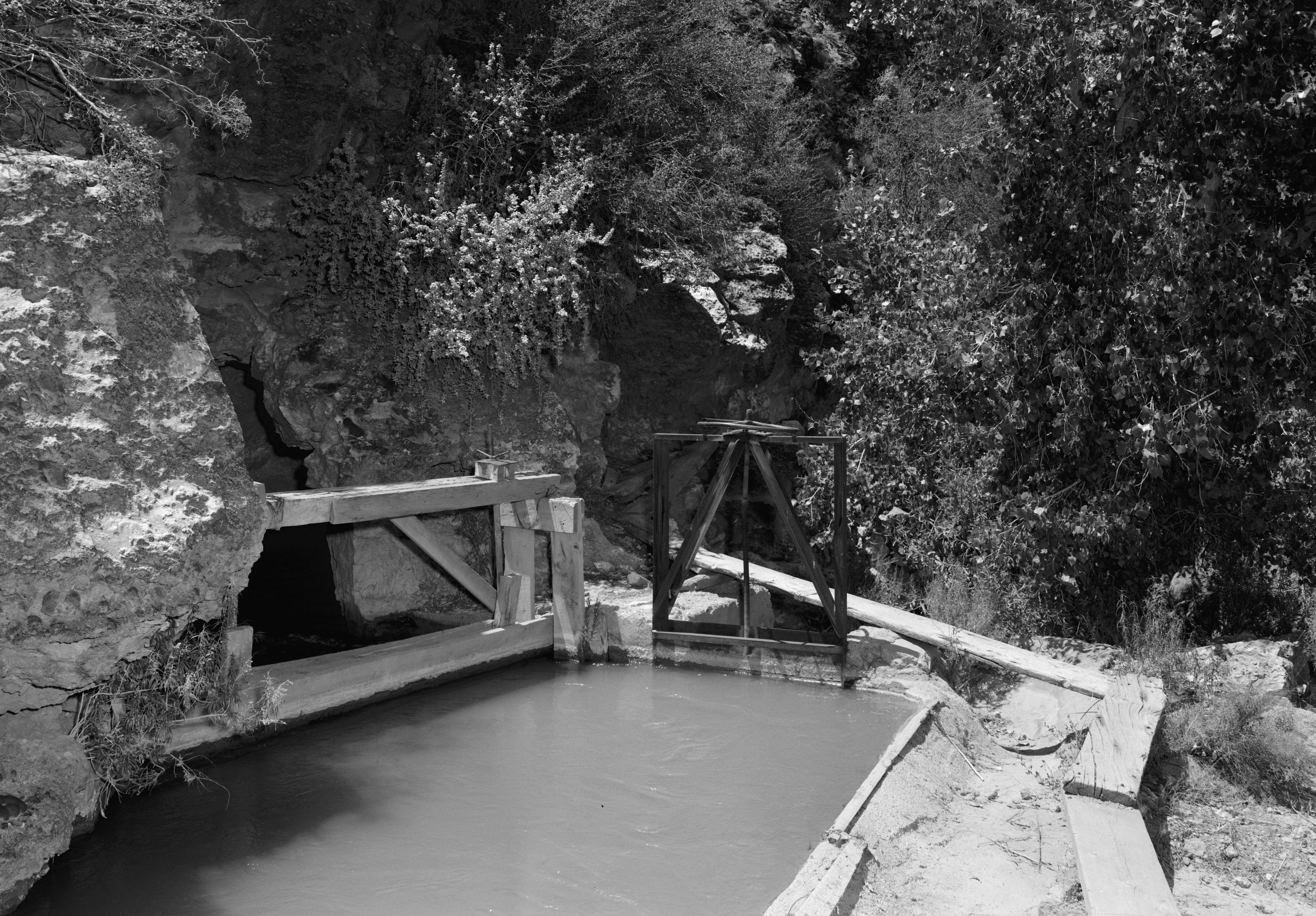

- Location within Utah Location within the United States
- Nearest city: Hurricane, Utah
- Coordinates: 37°11′04.45″N 113°16′40.7″W
- Area: 12.6 acres (5.1 ha)
- Built: 1904Jo
- Architect: Multiple
- NRHP reference No.: 77001324
- Added to NRHP: August 29, 1977

The Hurricane Canal is a hand-excavated irrigation canal that diverted water from the Virgin River to the east side of Hurricane, Utah, United States.

== Description ==
The 7.5-mile (12.1 km) canal was built starting in 1891 and completed in 1904. The work included a diversion dam on the Virgin River, the 12-foot (3.7 m) wide canal grade with an 8-foot (2.4 m) wide by 4-foot (1.2 m) deep channel, and a series of flumes and trestles. Work was done by local men, mainly between November and May. The work was paid for by the canal's shareholders, whose lands on the Hurricane Bench were to be irrigated by the canal. Allotments were limited to 20 acres (8.1 ha) for shareholder. The 2,000 acres (810 ha) of new agricultural lands allowed the settlement of Hurricane after 1906.

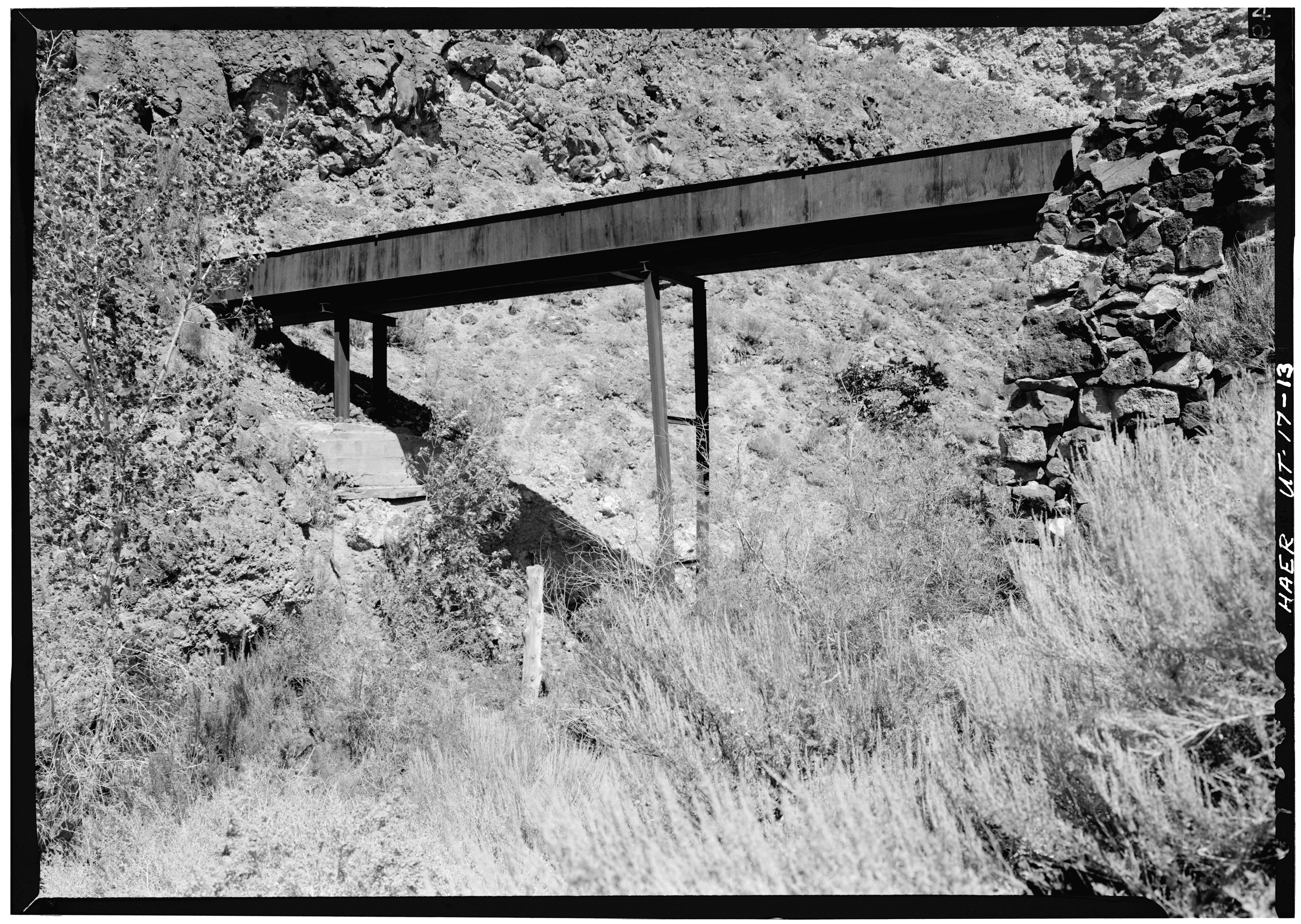
An aqueduct along the Hurricane Canala, August 1971

The work and the shareholder system were organized by James Jepson, Jr. and John Steele. The superintendent of construction was J.T. Willis. Work was hampered by the failure of the first two diversion dams at the Narrows section of the Virgin River. The final dam was a timber crib and boulder structure, later augmented with concrete. From the dam the canal runs westerly 3.5 miles (5.6 km) along the wall of the Virgin River Canyon, then south for 3 miles (4.8 km) along the Hurricane Cliffs to the Hurricane Bench. It passes through twelve tunnels and six flumes. Wood flumes have been replaced with metal, and ten cisterns for drinking water have been abandoned.

The Hurricane Canal was listed on the National Register of Historic Places on August 26, 1977. The canal no longer carries water. A trail now runs along the dry canal. Eleven of the twelve tunnels remain accessible to hikers.

== See also ==
- National Register of Historic Places listings in Washington County, Utah
