= Old Washington County Courthouse (Utah) =

- U.S. National Register of Historic Places
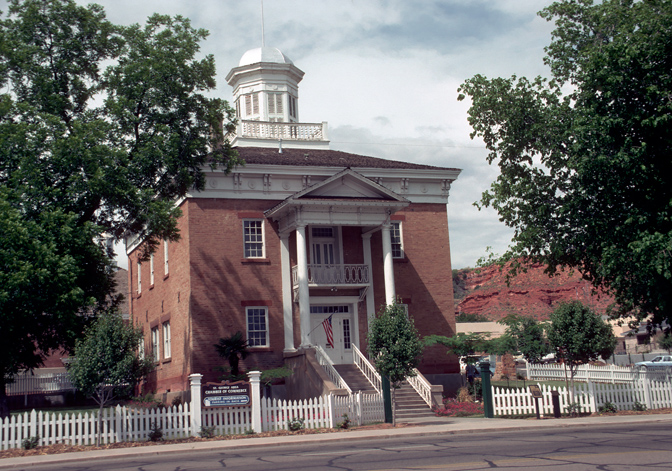

- Location within Utah Location within the United States
- Location: 85 E. 100 North, St. George, Utah
- Coordinates: 37°6′39″N 113°34′50″W
- Area: 0 acres (0 ha)
- Built: 1876
- NRHP reference No.: 70000634
- Added to NRHP: September 22, 1970

The Old Washington County Courthouse was the courthouse for Washington County, Utah from its completion in 1870 to 1960. Located in St. George, Utah, the courthouse is a two-story red brick structure with unusually thick walls. The 36.33-foot (11.07 m) by 40.33-foot (12.29 m) structure rests on a high basalt rock foundation that comprises the ground floor, and is capped by a pyramidal hipped roof with a prominent wood cupola.

The courthouse was listed on the National Register of Historic Places on September 22, 1970. The building is used for Chamber of Commerce offices and storage. The third-floor courtroom is used for lectures. The building may have been designed by William H. Folsom, who designed the similar but larger Salt Lake City Council Hall.
