= John Blake House =

Historic house in New York, United States

- U.S. National Register of Historic Places
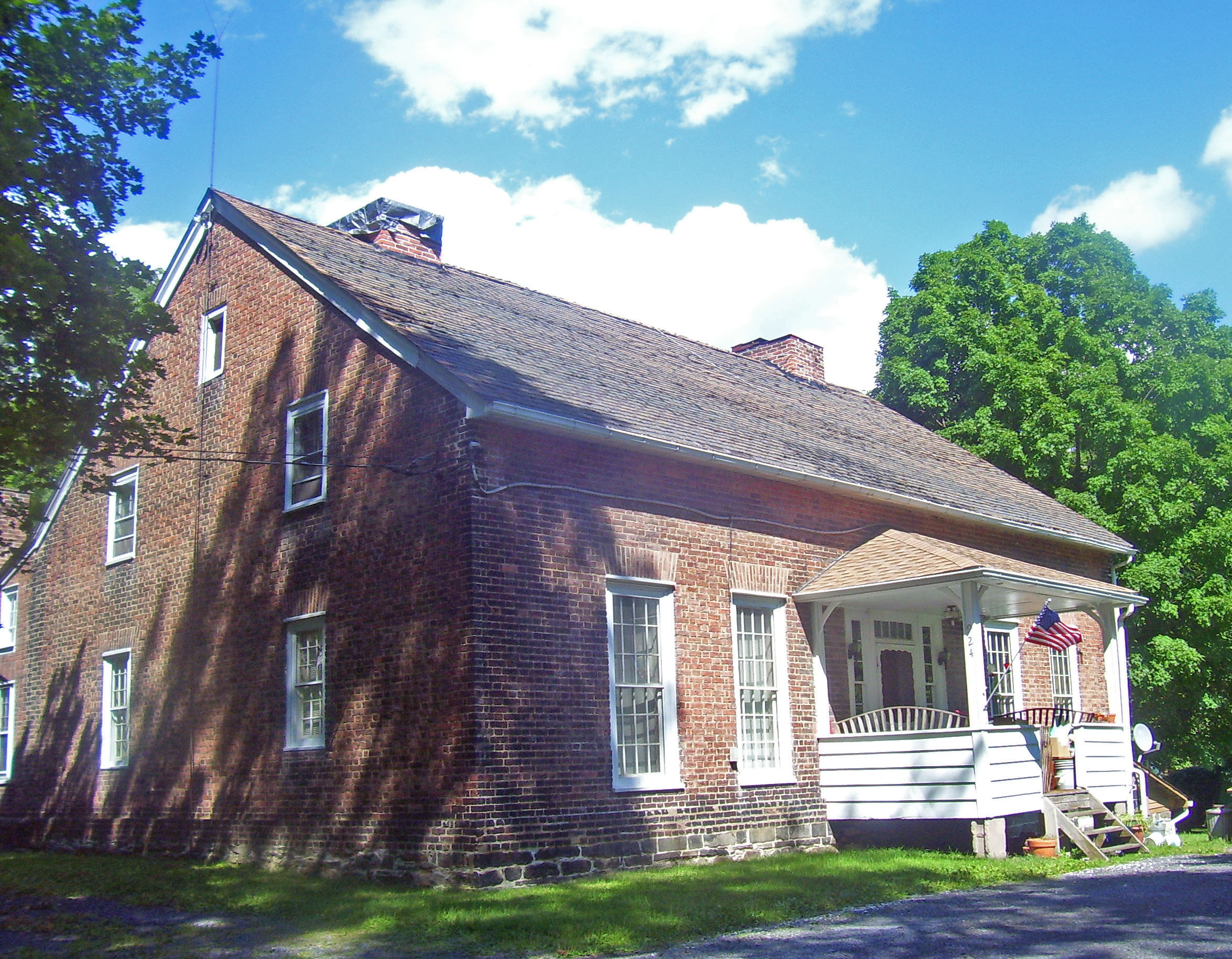
- Front (south) elevation and west profile, 2008

- Location within New York Location within the United States
- Location: Maybrook, NY
- Nearest city: Newburgh
- Coordinates: 41°29′37″N 74°12′34″W
- Area: 2.4 acres (9,700 m^{2})
- Built: 1794
- Architectural style: Federal
- NRHP reference No.: 84000521
- Added to NRHP: 1984

The John Blake House is located on Homestead Avenue (NY 208) in Maybrook, New York, United States. It is a brick building from the late 18th century, one of the oldest houses in the village

John Blake, a prominent local politician, built the house around an earlier log cabin. A wing was added in the mid-19th century, but it has not otherwise been altered. In 1984 it was added to the National Register of Historic Places as a well-preserved example of the kind of home built by settlers of English descent in the early years of the Federal style of American architecture.

== Building ==
The one-and-a-half-story house sits on a 2.4-acre (9,700 m^{2}) lot with many trees shielding it from view. It is made of brick with a stone basement and topped with a gabled roof shingled in asphalt and pierced by two brick chimneys near the end walls. The brick is laid in Flemish bond on the south and west with common bond in alternating rows of stretchers and headers on the other sides. The windows are trimmed in flat-arched molded brick.

A small wooden porch frames the entrance, a wooden paneled door with transom and sidelights. It opens into a large central hall leading to equally sized rooms on either side. Most of the mantelpieces are in the Federal style but one, in the northwest parlor, is Greek Revival in style.

The double Dutch door, once the original rear entrance, now connects the house and the kitchen wing added later. Upstairs are bedrooms, and a third level has been carved out of unused attic space. The basement, supposedly built for the earlier house, takes up the eastern half and includes a large arched chimney base.

Two of the original outbuildings remain, a shed and a privy. The foundations of three others can still be seen: a barn to the south of the house, a smokehouse to the northeast and the buttery once attached to the east of the house.

== Aesthetics ==
The house is conservative in form, hewing more closely to English vernacular traditions seen elsewhere in the Hudson Valley. Its low, square base is at odds with the generally more vertical buildings that typify the Federal style, manifested more in the interior floor plan and decor. The different bonds used in the brick suggest a bricklayer capable of a high degree of craftsmanship, but used on this form it does not appear that the builder was trying to apply any particular style or design trend.

== History ==
Blake, an early settler of the area, built the home around 1794 as the centerpiece of his father's 200-acre (50 ha) farm, "The Blake". At the time he was serving as deputy sheriff of Ulster County, which then included the northern towns of present-day Orange County. He would later serve as Orange County sheriff after the county line was relocated northward when Rockland County was created in the early 19th century. In the interim he served in the state assembly, and would later serve two terms in the U.S. House, as well as sitting as a judge. He concluded his political career with fifteen terms as Montgomery town supervisor. No other individual in the history of Orange County held so many positions at so many different levels.

As Maybrook grew, the Blake farm was broken up into smaller and smaller parcels, owned by others. The house would undergo renovations in the 1820s and 1840s, the latter adding a kitchen wing to the rear. When the village transformed into a railroad town in the late 19th century, the house was home to workers building the nearby connecting spur off the Erie Railroad main line later used by the New York, New Haven and Hartford Railroad. The front porch was added sometime in the 20th century.
