= Robert D. Covington House =

Historic house in Utah, United States

- U.S. National Register of Historic Places
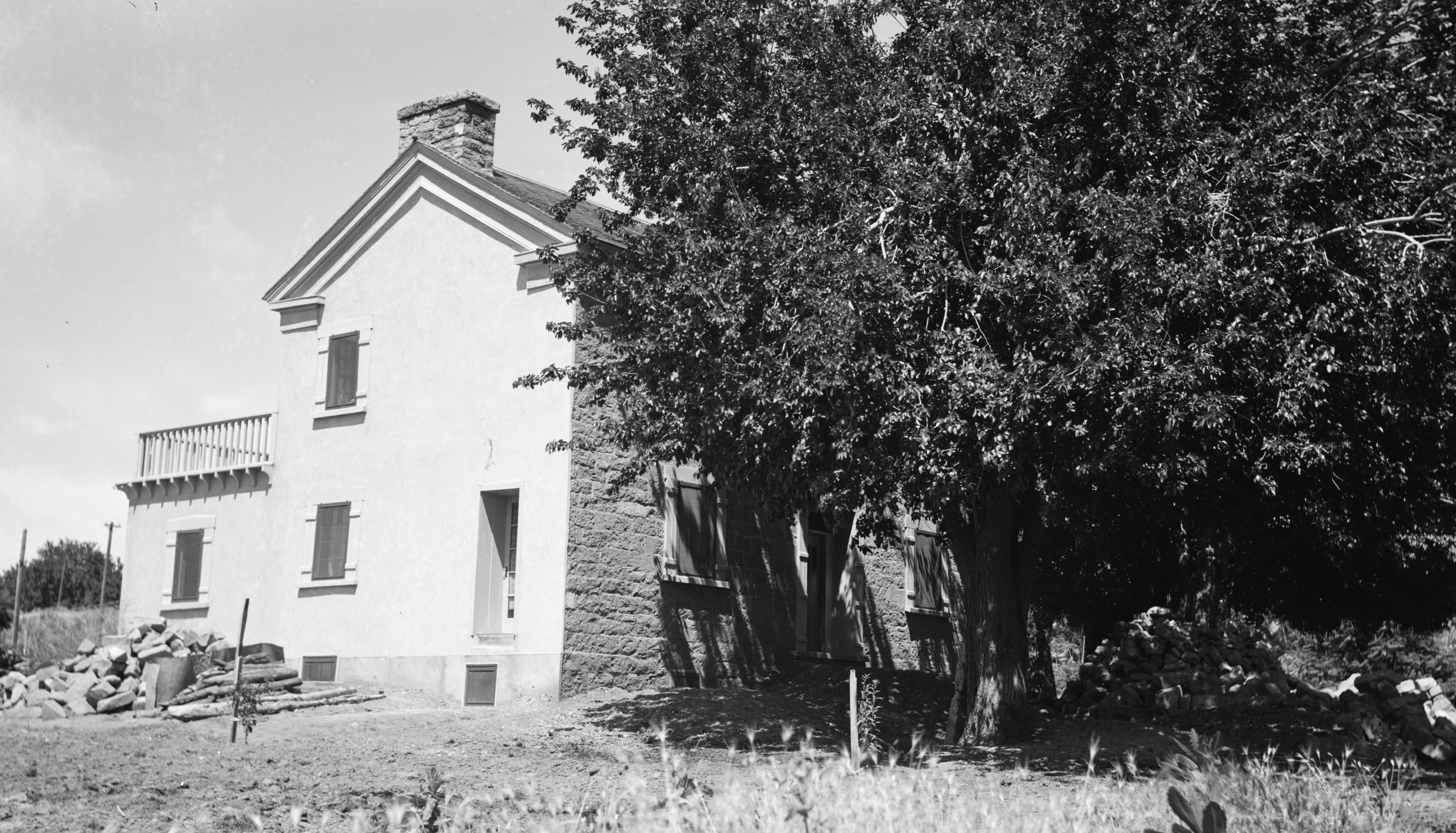
- HABS photograph

- Location within Utah Location within the United States
- Location: 200 N. 200 East, Washington, Utah
- Coordinates: 37°8′5″N 113°30′20″W
- Area: less than one acre
- Built: 1859
- Built by: Averett, Elijah; Averett, Elisha
- NRHP reference No.: 78002711
- Added to NRHP: April 20, 1978

The Robert D. Covington House was built in 1859 in Washington, Utah. Built for Mormon bishop Robert D. Covington, it was one of the first buildings in Washington and one of the largest in town, furnishing accommodation for visitors that included Brigham Young. The house's second floor originally consisted of one large room, allowing it to be used for assemblies and was especially handy for such household chores as drying fruit, quilting, weaving and the like. The second floor has since been subdivided. The Covington family living quarters were on the ground floor and basement.

The house is built of local red sandstone with two stories and a basement. It is an I-house with a rear extension. The house measures 21 feet (6.4 m) by 39 feet (12 m) with two chief rooms on the basement and first floor divided by a massive bearing wall. The west side of the house was stuccoed following a fire which burned the wooden stairs to the second floor. A front porch has been removed and a back extension added.

The Covington House was listed on the National Register of Historic Places on April 20, 1978. Throughout the years the house has gone through a number of owners. Inez Mitchell bought the house in 2001. It was for sale as of July 2, 2009, where The Covington House was then bought by Washington City in April 2012. Most of the old landscaping was removed and has been redone with the intent to reflect how it may have appeared in a more historical state.
