= Wallace Blake House =

- U.S. National Register of Historic Places
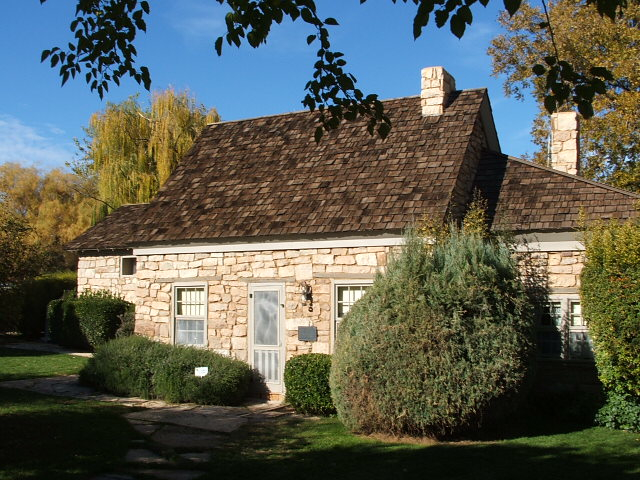
- Wallace Blake House, November 2004

- Location within Utah Location within the United States
- Location: 980 Manzanita Road; St. George, Utah; United States
- Coordinates: 37°02′49″N 113°36′15″W
- Area: less than one acre
- Built: 1908
- Built by: Dode Wiethen
- NRHP reference No.: 78002709
- Added to NRHP: November 14, 1978

The Wallace Blake House is a historic house in St. George, Utah, United States, that is listed on the National Register of Historic Places (NRHP).

== Description ==
The house is located at 980 Manzanita Road and was built in 1908 by stonemason Dode Wiethen and carpenter Brigham Carpenter. It was built with stones from the 1876 Price City LDS chapel. At the time of construction, it was located within Bloomington, a former community that was originally separate from, but is now part of the City of St. George.

It was listed on the NRHP November 14, 1978.

== See also ==
- National Register of Historic Places listings in Washington County, Utah
