= Chairman Blake House =

Historic house in North Carolina, United States

- U.S. National Register of Historic Places
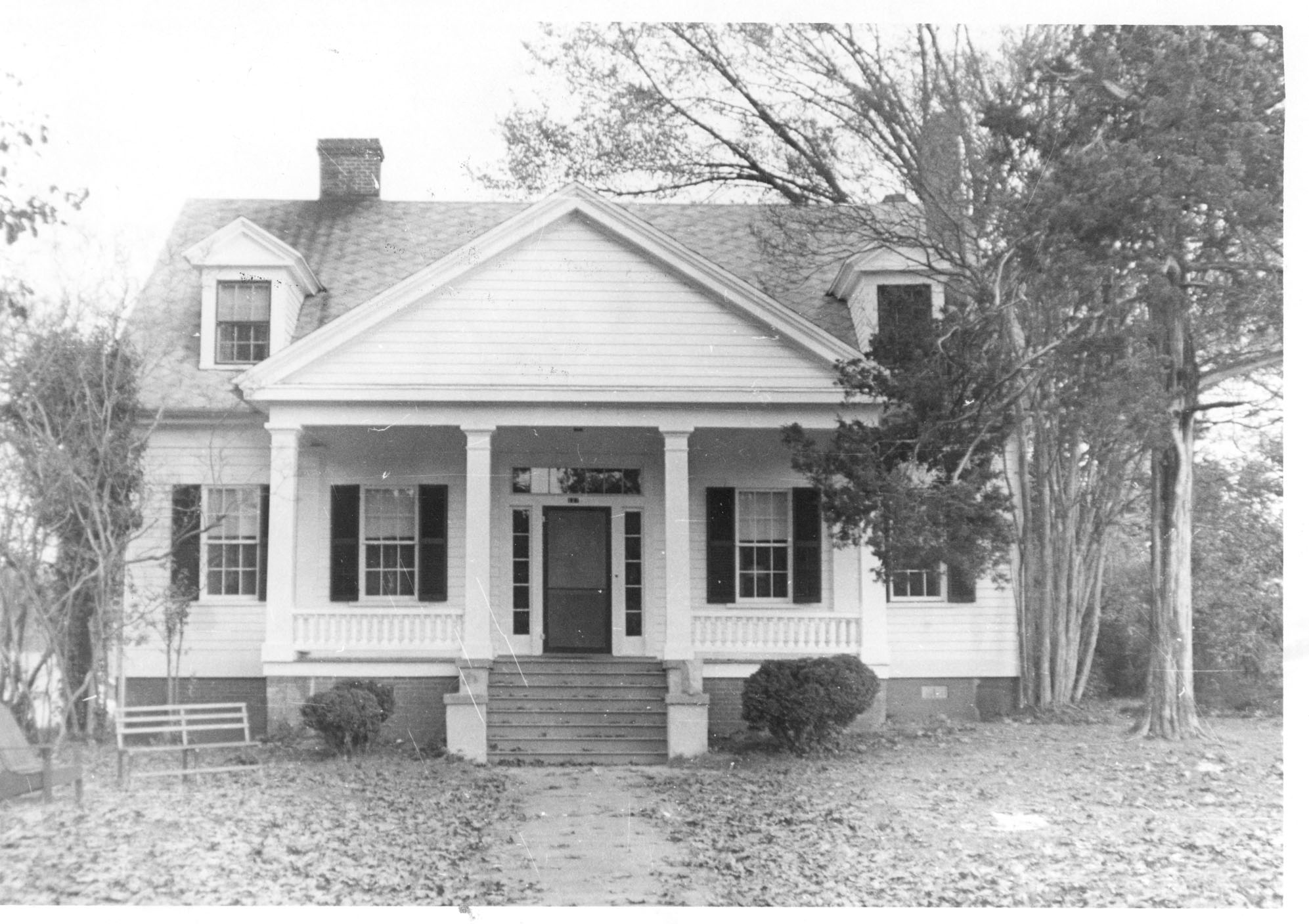
- Chairman Blake House, Early 20th Century

- Location within North Carolina Location within the United States
- Location: 318 Chairman Blake Ln., Davidson, North Carolina
- Coordinates: 35°29′52″N 80°50′54″W
- Area: less than one acre
- Built: 1860
- Architectural style: Greek Revival
- NRHP reference No.: 04000905
- Added to NRHP: August 25, 2004

Chairman Blake House is a historic private home located at Davidson, Mecklenburg County, North Carolina. It was built about 1860, and is a 1 1/2-story, five-bay, double pile Greek Revival style frame dwelling with a one-story rear ell. It has steep side gable roof, four brick interior chimneys, and weatherboard sheathing. It features porches on the front and rear facades supported by Tuscan order columns. It was moved to its present location in October 2000. It was the home of Professor John Rennie Blake (1825–1900), who is believed to have occupied the house throughout his tenure at Davidson College, 1861–1885. Today, the home is privately owned.

It was listed on the National Register of Historic Places in 2004.
