= Washington, Utah =

City in Utah, United States

- City
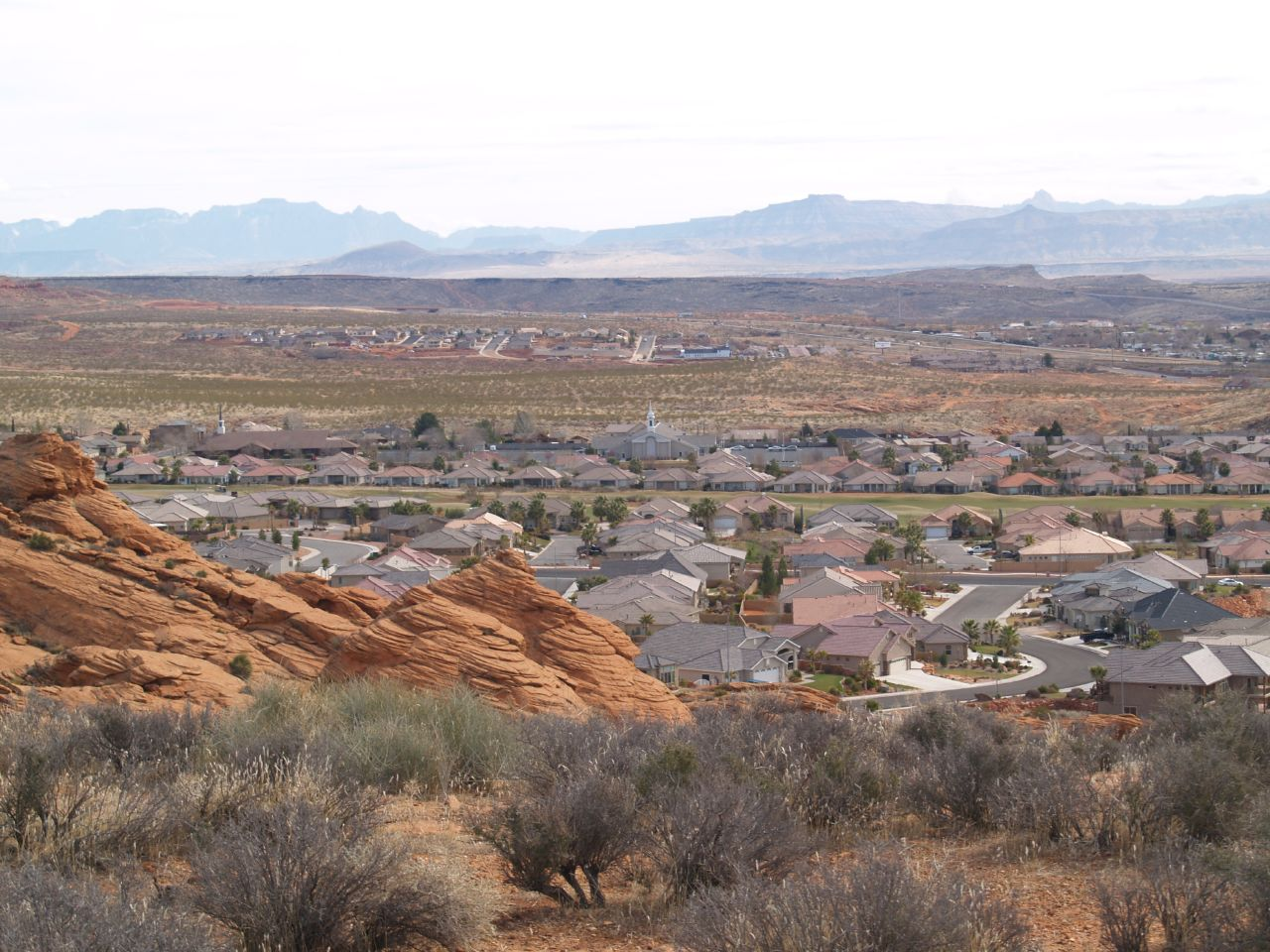

- Location in Washington County and the state of Utah
- Coordinates: 37°07′30″N 113°29′12″W
- Country: United States
- State: Utah
- County: Washington
- Settled: 1857
- Named for: George Washington

Area
  - Total: 34.78 sq mi (90.09 km^{2})
  - Land: 34.78 sq mi (90.09 km^{2})
  - Water: 0 sq mi (0.00 km^{2})
- Elevation: 2,894 ft (882 m)

Population (2020)
  - Total: 27,993
  - Density: 838.7/sq mi (323.82/km^{2})
- Time zone: UTC-7 (Mountain (MST))
  - Summer (DST): UTC-6 (MDT)
- ZIP code: 84780
- Area code: 435
- FIPS code: 49-81960
- GNIS feature ID: 2412187
- Website: Official website

Washington is a city in south central Washington County, Utah, United States and is a part of the St. George Metropolitan Area. The area is also known as Utah's Dixie because the Mormon pioneers who settled the St. George area came to the area to raise cotton, which was milled at the cotton mill in Washington. The population was 27,993 as of 2020. Washington is a fast-growing suburb of St. George, and is the second largest city in Washington County.

The city was named after U.S. President George Washington. The city administration has encouraged the use of the name "Washington City" in recent years.

== History ==
The Church of Jesus Christ of Latter-Day Saints sent a group of 28 families to the area to attempt to grow cotton. The "cotton mission" was led by former Mississippi cotton plantation owner Robert Dockery Covington, along with some of the early settlers from the southeastern United States. The area was nicknamed Utah's Dixie; Dixie was a nickname for the southeastern states.

== Geography ==
According to the United States Census Bureau, the city has a total area of 32.5 square miles (85.2 km^{2}), of which 32.5 square miles (85.1 km^{2}) is land and 0.07 square mile (0.1 km^{2}) (0.10%) is water.

== Demographics ==
Historical population
Census	Pop.	Note	%±
1860	196		—
1870	463		136.2%
1880	483		4.3%
1890	315		−34.8%
1900	529		67.9%
1910	424		−19.8%
1920	464		9.4%
1930	435		−6.2%
1940	507		16.6%
1950	435		−14.2%
1960	445		2.3%
1970	750		68.5%
1980	3,092		312.3%
1990	4,198		35.8%
2000	8,186		95.0%
2010	18,761		129.2%
2020	27,993		49.2%
U.S. Decennial Census

=== 2020 census ===
As of the 2020 census, Washington had a population of 27,993. The median age was 36.5 years. 28.8% of residents were under the age of 18 and 20.6% of residents were 65 years of age or older. For every 100 females there were 99.7 males, and for every 100 females age 18 and over there were 95.9 males age 18 and over.

94.6% of residents lived in urban areas, while 5.4% lived in rural areas.

There were 9,437 households in Washington, of which 35.7% had children under the age of 18 living in them. Of all households, 65.8% were married-couple households, 11.8% were households with a male householder and no spouse or partner present, and 18.4% were households with a female householder and no spouse or partner present. About 16.5% of all households were made up of individuals and 9.6% had someone living alone who was 65 years of age or older.

There were 11,523 housing units, of which 18.1% were vacant. The homeowner vacancy rate was 2.1% and the rental vacancy rate was 12.0%.

Racial composition as of the 2020 census
Race	Number	Percent
White	24,044	85.9%
Black or African American	128	0.5%
American Indian and Alaska Native	261	0.9%
Asian	298	1.1%
Native Hawaiian and Other Pacific Islander	259	0.9%
Some other race	1,077	3.8%
Two or more races	1,926	6.9%
Hispanic or Latino (of any race)	2,700	9.6%

=== 2000 census ===
As of the 2000 census, there were 8,186 people, 2,614 households, and 2,117 families residing in the city. The population density was 259.7 inhabitants per square mile (100.3/km^{2}). There were 3,199 housing units at an average density of 101.5 per square mile (39.2/km^{2}). The racial makeup of the city was 94.31% White, 0.37% African American, 1.71% Native American, 0.29% Asian, 0.10% Pacific Islander, 2.15% from other races, and 1.08% from two or more races. Hispanic or Latino of any race were 4.69% of the population.

There were 2,614 households, out of which 36.3% had children under the age of 18 living with them, 71.4% were married couples living together, 7.3% had a female householder with no husband present, and 19.0% were non-families. 16.6% of all households were made up of individuals, and 9.2% had someone living alone who was 65 years of age or older. The average household size was 3.00 and the average family size was 3.37.

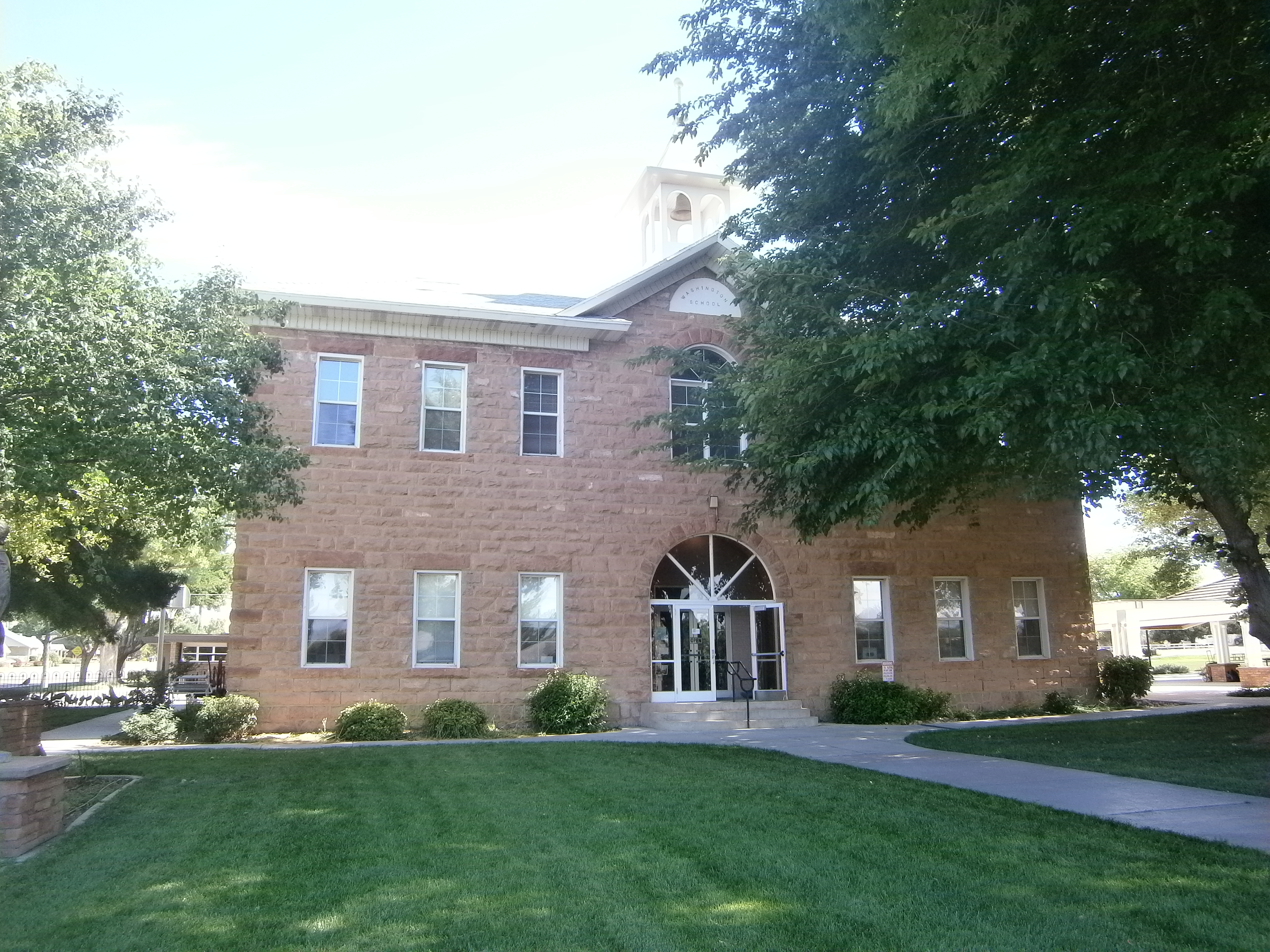
Washington, Utah museum

In the city, the population was spread out, with 30.1% under the age of 18, 10.9% from 18 to 24, 22.6% from 25 to 44, 17.8% from 45 to 64, and 18.7% who were 65 years of age or older. The median age was 32 years. For every 100 females, there were 104.4 males. For every 100 females age 18 and over, there were 107.2 males.

The median income for a household in the city was $35,341, and the median income for a family was $39,003. Males had a median income of $28,750 versus $20,434 for females. The per capita income for the city was $14,032. About 7.5% of families and 7.9% of the population were below the poverty line, including 10.3% of those under age 18 and 1.1% of those age 65 or over.

== Government ==
The City of Washington has five city council members: Councilwoman Kim Casperson, Councilman Craig Coats, Councilman Bret Henderson, Councilman Kurt Ivie, and Benjamin L Martinsen. Mayor Kress Staheli was elected in 2021 and has been mayor since January 2022. Washington has a city manager which runs the day-to-day activities. As of 2021, the city manager is Jeremy Redd, who was appointed in 2020.

== Education ==
The entire county is within the Washington County School District, which covers the entire county. School district-operated schools in the city limits include:

Elementary schools

- Coral Canyon Elementary School
- Horizon Elementary School
- Majestic Fields Elementary School
- Riverside Elementary School
- Washington Elementary School

Secondary schools

- Washington Fields Intermediate School
- Crimson Cliffs Middle School
- Crimson Cliffs High School; its coverage zone extends into St. George

Fossil Ridge Intermediate School, Pine View Middle School, and Pine View High School are in St. George; northern parts of the Washington city limits are zoned to these three schools. A majority of Washington residents attend schools within the Pine View cone site; residents in old town Washington, the Buena Vista and Green Springs neighborhoods, and the northern section of Washington Fields have attended Pine View-which is just across the city boundary in neighboring St. George-since it opened in 1983

Charter schools

- St. George Academy in Washington City College Prep Charter High School which serves St. George and surrounding communities

== Notable people ==
- Tyler James Robinson, alleged assassin of Charlie Kirk
- Von Lester Taylor, one of the two perpetrators in the 1990 Tiede cabin murders

== See also ==
- Elephant Arch
- Washington School, former school building now home to the city's historical museum
- List of municipalities in Utah
