= Santa Clara, Utah =

American city in Utah, founded 1854

- City
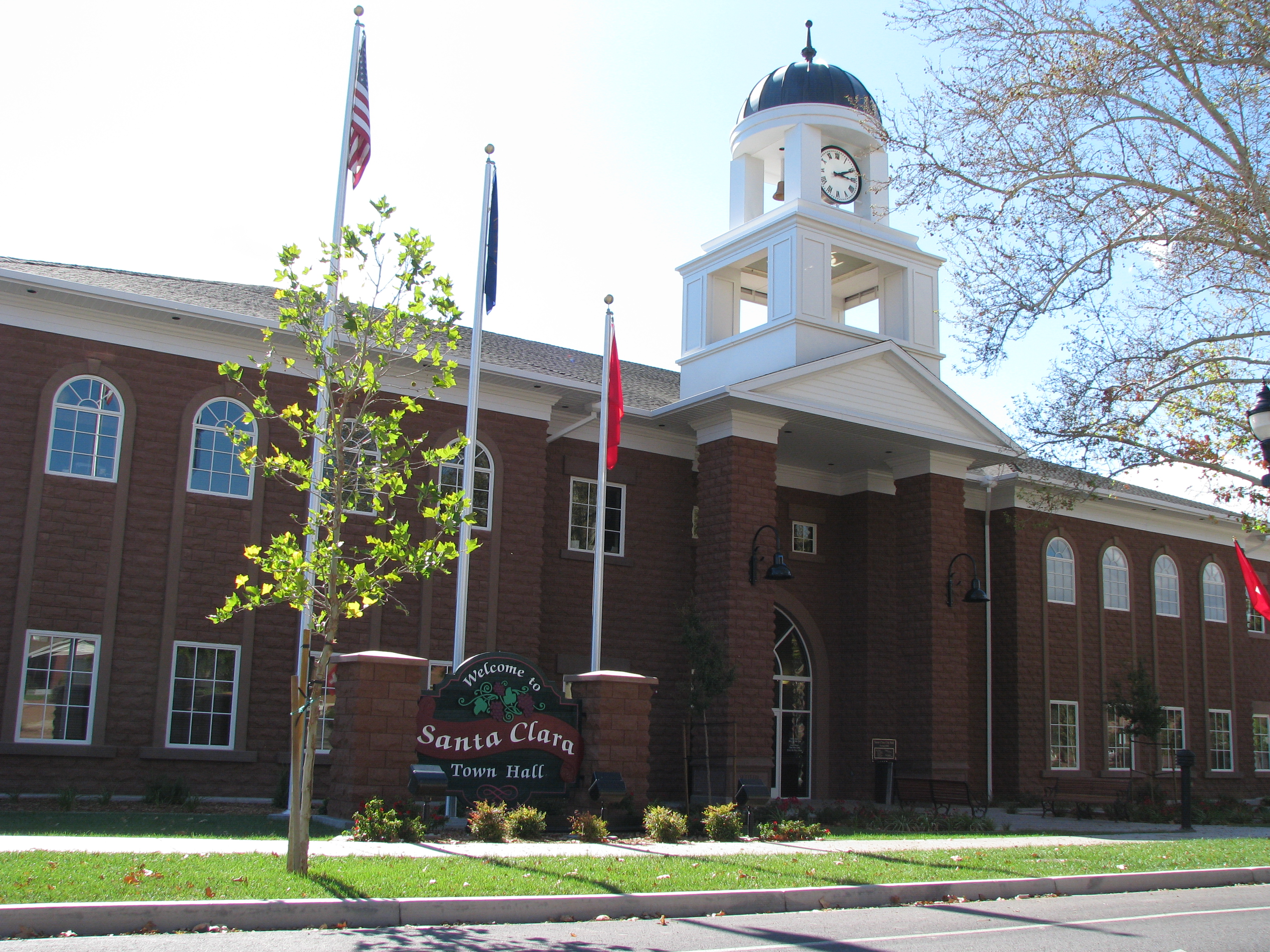
- Santa Clara City Hall

- Flag

- Location in surrounding Washington County and the southwestern portion of the state of Utah
- Coordinates: 37°07′30″N 113°39′20″W
- Country: United States
- State: Utah
- County: Washington
- Settled: 1854
- Founder: Jacob Hamblin (1819-1886)
- Named for: Santa Clara River

Area
  - Total: 6.13 sq mi (15.87 km^{2})
  - Land: 6.12 sq mi (15.85 km^{2})
  - Water: 0.0039 sq mi (0.01 km^{2})
- Elevation: 2,759 ft (841 m)

Population (2020)
  - Total: 7,553
  - Density: 1,375.4/sq mi (531.03/km^{2})
- Time zone: UTC-7 (Mountain (MST))
  - Summer (DST): UTC-6 (MDT)
- ZIP code: 84765
- Area code: 435
- FIPS code: 49-67660
- GNIS feature ID: 2411818

Santa Clara is a city in Washington County, in southwestern Utah, (Western United States) and is a part of the St. George Metropolitan Area. As of the 2020 census, Santa Clara had a population of 7,553. The region and county borders the states of Arizona to the south and Nevada to the west. The town is a western suburb of the nearby county seat and larger city of St. George, Utah

== History ==
In 1854, Jacob Hamblin (1819–1886), was called by Latter-day Saint patriarch Brigham Young (1801–1877), in the capital city of Salt Lake City, to serve a mission to the southern Paiute native areas of the recently organized old federal Utah Territory (1850–1896), and settled in the southwestern corner then of the Territory at Santa Clara, in the vicinity of the modern city of St. George, Utah. The town is among the oldest in the area and the state.

The first settlers built Fort Clara, also known as Fort Santa Clara, in the winter of 1855–1856. In the fall of 1861, Swiss immigrant members of The Church of Jesus Christ of Latter-day Saints (Mormons) arrived at the new settlement. Shortly afterward, in early 1862, they were victims of a severe flood in the Santa Clara River valley that destroyed the fort and most other buildings, along with already existing irrigation dams and ditches. This event was part of the infamous Great Flood of 1862.

Hamblin's first home in Santa Clara was destroyed in the 1862 flood. His second wife Rachael saved one of their young children from drowning, but the child soon after died from exposure. Rachael never fully recovered from exposure she suffered during the flood. Swearing to avoid such a risk again, Hamblin built a new home on a hill in Santa Clara. It is owned today by the Church of Jesus Christ of Latter-day Saints (LDS Church), which operates it as a house museum. Latter-day Saint missionaries give daily tours.

19th-century Santa Clara was largely inhabited by immigrants who had earlier converted to Latter-day Saints faith in Switzerland and subsequently crossed the Atlantic Ocean and traveled across the North American continent to come to Utah. Among these was Daniel Bonelli, who after the 1862 flood became a pioneer colonist of St. Thomas, Nevada in the Moapa Valley. He was a farmer, salt miner, and owner of Bonelli's Ferry, at nearby Rioville, Nevada. This was on the road between the old southwestern Utah Territory (1850–1896) and the old Arizona Territory (1863–1912) further south, at the confluence of the Virgin River and the Colorado River.

== Geography ==
According to the United States Census Bureau, the city has a total area of 4.9 square miles (12.7 km^{2}), of which 4.9 square miles (12.6 km^{2}) is land and 0.04 square mile (0.1 km^{2}) (0.41%) is water.

== Demographics ==
Historical population
Census	Pop.	Note	%±
1880	194		—
1890	202		4.1%
1900	358		77.2%
1910	390		8.9%
1920	305		−21.8%
1930	249		−18.4%
1940	283		13.7%
1950	319		12.7%
1960	291		−8.8%
1970	271		−6.9%
1980	1,091		302.6%
1990	2,322		112.8%
2000	4,630		99.4%
2010	6,003		29.7%
2020	7,553		25.8%
2019 (est.)	8,417		40.2%
U.S. Decennial Census

=== 2020 census ===
As of the 2020 census, Santa Clara had a population of 7,553, a median age of 35.0 years, 31.0% of residents under the age of 18, 16.5% aged 65 years or older, and 103.7 males per 100 females (98.9 males per 100 females age 18 and over).

96.3% of residents lived in urban areas, while 3.7% lived in rural areas.

There were 2,267 households in Santa Clara, of which 42.8% had children under the age of 18 living in them. Of all households, 75.3% were married-couple households, 8.3% were households with a male householder and no spouse or partner present, and 14.1% were households with a female householder and no spouse or partner present. About 11.2% of all households were made up of individuals and 6.3% had someone living alone who was 65 years of age or older.

There were 2,618 housing units in Santa Clara, of which 13.4% were vacant. The homeowner vacancy rate was 1.1% and the rental vacancy rate was 14.3%.

Racial composition as of the 2020 census
Race	Number	Percent
White	6,746	89.3%
Black or African American	15	0.2%
American Indian and Alaska Native	37	0.5%
Asian	72	1.0%
Native Hawaiian and Other Pacific Islander	59	0.8%
Some other race	187	2.5%
Two or more races	437	5.8%
Hispanic or Latino (of any race)	512	6.8%

=== 2000 census ===
As of the 2000 census of 2000, there were 4,630 people, 1,225 households, and 1,134 families residing in the city. The population density was 948.1 inhabitants per square mile (366.1/km^{2}). There were 1,294 housing units at an average density of 265.0 per square mile (102.3/km^{2}). The racial makeup of the city was 97.32% White, 0.15% African American, 0.30% Native American, 0.28% Asian, 0.32% Pacific Islander, 0.48% from other races, and 1.14% from two or more races. Hispanic or Latino of any race were 2.03% of the population.

There were 1,225 households, out of which 57.3% had children under the age of 18 living with them, 86.0% were married couples living together, 4.8% had a female householder with no husband present, and 7.4% were non-families. 6.4% of all households were made up of individuals, and 3.6% had someone living alone who was 65 years of age or older. The average household size was 3.78 and the average family size was 3.96.

In the town, the population was spread out, with 40.2% under the age of 18, 9.3% from 18 to 24, 23.7% from 25 to 44, 17.3% from 45 to 64, and 9.5% who were 65 years of age or older. The median age was 26 years. For every 100 females, there were 105.0 males. For every 100 females age 18 and over, there were 101.8 males.

The median income for a household in the city was $52,770, and the median income for a family was $55,000. Males had a median income of $41,350 versus $21,495 for females. The per capita income for the city was $15,957. About 2.7% of families and 3.5% of the population were below the poverty line, including 4.1% of those under age 18 and 2.8% of those age 65 or over.

== Arts and culture ==
Santa Clara is home to several sites of importance to the LDS Church and local town / county history, including the historic Jacob Hamblin Home (of pioneer settler Jacob Hamblin (1819–1886) and the old Relief Society house, built in 1907.

== Education ==
Various public schools service the local student population, all are within the Washington County School District, with all the usual competitive athletics and activities programs of the region competing in Region 9 of the Utah High School Activities Association (UHSAA).

=== Elementary ===
- Santa Clara Elementary (K-5 grades)
- Arrowhead Elementary School (K-5 grades)
- Lava Ridge Intermediate School (6–7 grades)

=== Secondary ===
- Snow Canyon Middle School (8–9 grades in St. George, Utah)
- Snow Canyon High School (10–12 grades, St. George)

=== Higher education ===
- Utah Tech University (St. George)

== Notable people ==
- Wilford Brimley, Hollywood cowboy actor and stuntman

== See also ==
- Robert L. Shepherd Desert Arboretum
- Swiss Days
