= WCHS =

WCHS may refer to:

== Broadcasting ==
- WCHS (AM), a radio station (580 AM) licensed to Charleston, West Virginia, United States
- WCHS-TV, a television station (channel 29, virtual 8) licensed to Charleston, West Virginia

== Education ==
Multiple schools:

- Western Christian High School (disambiguation), is the name of multiple schools
- Winston Churchill High School (disambiguation) is the name of multiple schools

Canada:

- Western Canada High School in Calgary, Alberta
- Wetaskiwin Composite High School in Wetaskiwin, Alberta

United Kingdom:

- West Calder High School near Livingston, West Lothian, Scotland
- Woodford County High School in Woodford Green, London

United States:

- Warren Central High School (Indiana) in Indianapolis, Indiana
- Washington Catholic High School in Washington, Indiana
- Water Canyon High School in Hildale, Utah
- Watson Chapel High School in Pine Bluff, Arkansas
- Webb City High School in Webb City, Missouri
- Webster County High School in Upperglade, West Virginia
- Wesley Chapel High School in Wesley Chapel, Florida
- West Carroll High School in Savanna, Illinois
- West Carrollton High School in West Carrollton, Ohio
- West Clermont High School in Union Township, Clermont County, Ohio
- West Covina High School in West Covina, California
- Whiteland Community High School in Whiteland, Indiana
- Whittier Christian High School in La Habra, California
- Wildwood Catholic High School (now Wildwood Catholic Academy) in North Wildwood, New Jersey
- Woodford County High School in Versailles, Kentucky
- Worthington Christian High School (Worthington, Ohio) in Worthington, Franklin County, Ohio

== Other uses ==
- West China Hospital of Stomatology in Chengdu, Sichuan, China
