= UEP =

UEP may refer to:

- Unique-event polymorphism, a class of genetic markers used to define haplogroups
- United Egg Producers, an agricultural cooperative in the Midwestern United States which represents the interests of regional egg producers
- University of Eastern Philippines, a public university in Northern Samar province
- University of Exeter Press, an academic press based in Exeter, United Kingdom
- United Effort Plan, a property-holding organization of the FLDS Church
- Ashmolean Museum University Engagement Programme, a teaching programme of the Ashmolean Museum of Art and Archaeology in the University of Oxford
- US Expatriate Pension, a type of pension/retirement solution for US tax payers who are non US residents
- Unequal error protection, an error correction scheme
- Poznań University of Economics and Business
