= Washington County School District (Utah) =

School district in Utah, USA

Location
- St. George, Utah United States
- Coordinates: 37°6′28″N 113°35′05″W

District information
- Established: June 1915
- Superintendent: Richard Holmes
- NCES District ID: 4901140

Students and staff
- Students: 42,562

Other information
- Website: www.washk12.org

Washington County School District is a school district headquartered in St. George, Utah, United States, with 42,562 students enrolled as of May 2024, up from 34,771 students in January 2021. The district serves students in all of Washington County.

The Washington County School District administrative office building, located at 121 West Tabernacle, St. George, was constructed in a style to fit in with the surrounding historic sandstone buildings.

The district provides public education for students in kindergarten through twelfth grade in Washington County cities and towns, including St. George, Bloomington, Bloomington Hills, Winchester Hills, Dammeron Valley, Washington, Santa Clara, Ivins, Hurricane, La Verkin, Central, Veyo, Pine Valley, Leeds, Hildale, Springdale, and Toquerville, covering an area of over 2,400 square miles (over 6,200 square kilometers).

The district also provides special education services for adults through Post High School.

== History ==
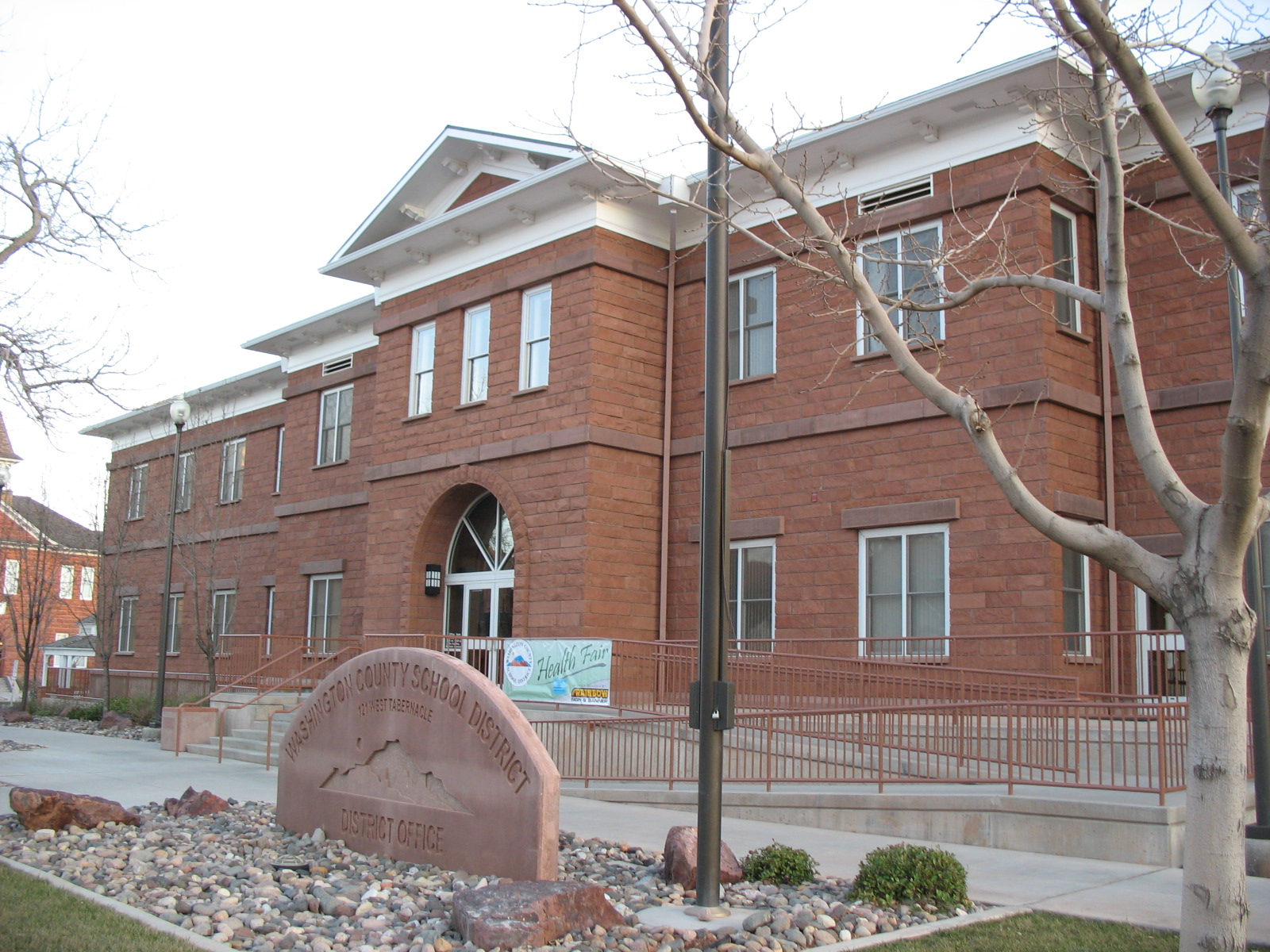
Washington County School District Office

Washington County School District was formed in June 1915 by the consolidation of nineteen separate school districts.

=== Mission statement ===
Mission statement	Period
"Proceed on the premise of what's best for kids"	1984–1996
"Together: Pioneering New Horizons in Teaching, Learning, and Leading."	1996–2003
"Improve Student Achievement"	2003–present

=== Superintendents ===
Name	Term
W. O. Bentley	1916–1929
M. E. Moody	1929–1958
LaVoy Esplin	1958–1979
Jack Burr	1979–1984
Steve Peterson	1984–1996
Kolene F. Granger	1996–2003
Max Rose	2003–2013
Larry Bergeson	2013–2023
Richard Holmes	2023–present

== Board of education ==
- David Stirland, President
- LaRene Cox, Vice President
- Craig Seegmiller
- Burke Staheli
- Nannette Simmons
- Heidi Gunn
- Ron Wade

== Schools ==
=== High schools ===
In WCSD all high schools are grades 10-12 with the exception of Enterprise and Water Canyon, which both operate 7-12 & Career Tech High which has grades 9-12.

- Career Tech High School, St. George
- Crimson Cliffs High School, Washington

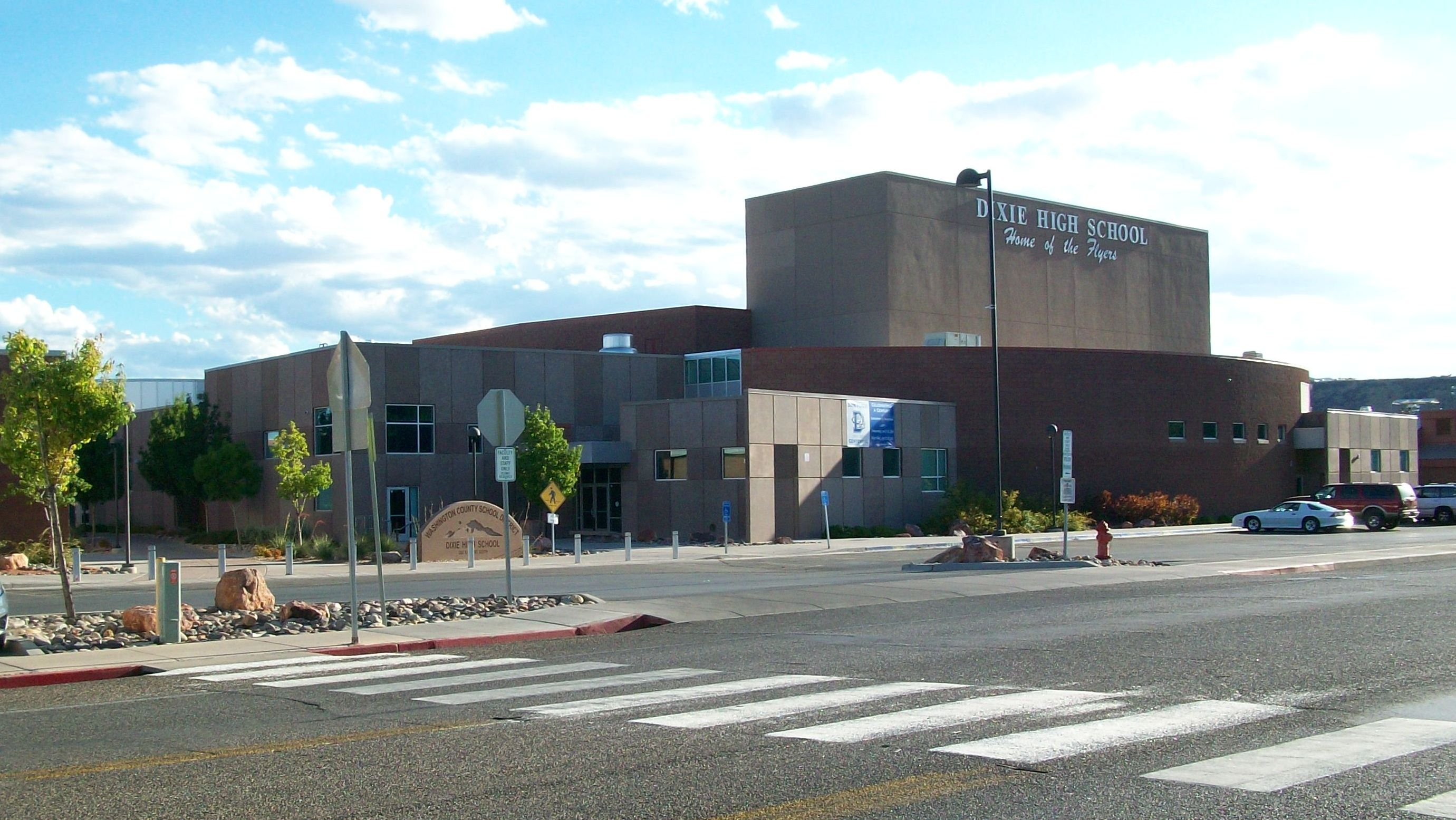
Dixie High School

- Desert Hills High School, St. George
- Dixie High School, St. George
- Enterprise High School (Utah), Enterprise
- Hurricane High School, Hurricane
- Millcreek High School, St. George
- Pine View High School, St. George
- Snow Canyon High School, St. George
- Southwest Adult High School, St. George
- Utah Online School, St. George
- Water Canyon High School, Hildale

=== Middle schools ===
In WCSD all middle schools are grades 8-9, with Enterprise and Water Canyon students within their respective high school.

- Crimson Cliffs Middle School, Washington
- Dixie Middle School, St. George
- Hurricane Middle School, Hurricane
- Pine View Middle School, St. George
- Snow Canyon Middle School, St. George
- Desert Hills Middle School, St. George
- Utah Online School, St. George

=== Intermediate schools ===
In WCSD all intermediate schools are grades 6-7, while at Enterprise and Water Canyon 7th grade attend the high school, and 6th grade attend the respective elementary.

- Fossil Ridge Intermediate School, St. George
- Hurricane Intermediate School, Hurricane
- Lava Ridge Intermediate School, Santa Clara
- Sunrise Ridge Intermediate School, St. George
- Tonaquint Intermediate School, St. George
- Utah Online School, St. George
- Washington Fields Intermediate, Washington

=== Elementary schools ===
In WCSD all elementary schools are grades PK-5, with Enterprise and Water Canyon elementary schools also including the 6th grade.

- Arrowhead Elementary School, Santa Clara
- Bloomington Elementary School, St. George
- Bloomington Hills Elementary School, St. George
- Coral Canyon Elementary, Washington
- Crimson View Elementary School, St. George
- Desert Canyons Elementary School, St. George
- Diamond Valley Elementary School, St. George
- Enterprise Elementary School, Enterprise
- Heritage Elementary School (formerly West Elementary), St. George
- Horizon Elementary School, Washington
- Hurricane Elementary School, Hurricane
- LaVerkin Elementary School, La Verkin
- Legacy Elementary School (formerly East Elementary), St. George
- Little Valley Elementary School, St. George
- Majestic Fields Elementary School, Washington
- Panorama Elementary School, St. George
- Paradise Canyon Elementary School (formerly Dixie Sun, Dixie Downs Elementary), St. George
- Red Mountain Elementary School, Ivins
- Riverside Elementary School, Washington
- Sandstone Elementary School, St. George
- Santa Clara Elementary School, Santa Clara
- South Mesa Elementary School, St. George
- Springdale Elementary School, Springdale
- Sunset Elementary School, St. George
- Three Falls Elementary School, Hurricane
- Washington Elementary School, Washington
- Water Canyon School, Hildale
- Utah Online School, St. George

=== Former schools ===
The district previously operated Phelps Elementary and Middle School, a K-8 school. In early 2000 it had over 400 pupils. In late 2000 its enrollment fell to 90 after fundamentalist Mormon groups withdrew their children. In fall 2001 its enrollment would have been below 12, so the district closed it and sold it as surplus. In 2014 the district re-purchased the property and opened it in the fall as Water Canyon School.

- St. George Elementary School, St. George
- Washington School, Washington
- Woodward School, St. George

== Clubs ==
- Academic Decathlon
- Animation Club
- ASL Club
- Ballroom Dance
- Bowling Club: St. George High School Bowling Club
  - This is a multi high school club that serves students from Dixie, Pineview, Snow Canyon, and Desert Hills.
- Debate
- DECA
- Drama Club
- FBLA: Future Business Leaders of America
- FCCLA: Family, Career and Community Leaders of America
- FFA: Future Farmers of America
- French Club
- German Club
- GSA: Gay-straight alliance
  - Three high schools in St. George operated by the school district have gay-straight alliance clubs founded in the autumn of 2010, The New York Times reported in January 2011, although the alliance organizers encountered hostility from some students.
- GYC
- HOSA: Health Occupations Students of America
- Interact Club
  - Works with the local Rotary Club
- International Club
- Key Club
- JROTC
- Letterman's Club
- National Honor Society
- Pep Club
- Ping Pong Club
- Polynesian Club
- RASK
- Reading Club
- Science Club
- Science Olympiad
- Speech & Debate Club
- SkillsUSA
- Spanish Club
- Upward Bound
