= Jaslyn Gardner =

American sprinter (born 2000)

Personal information
- Born: June 1, 2000 (age 26)

Sport
- Sport: Athletics
- Event: Sprint
- College team: BYU Cougars

Achievements and titles
- Personal bests: 60m: 7.13 (2025); 100m: 11.01 (2026); 200m: 23.10 (2024)

Jaslyn Gardner (born June 1, 2000) is an American sprinter. She was selected to represent the United States over 60 metres at the 2026 World Athletics Indoor Championships.

== Biography ==
From Enterprise, Utah, Gardner excelled in track and field from a young age, running her first race at the age of nine years-old and winning her first ling jump competition. She won the national title over 100 metres in the 13-14-year-old girls age-group at the 2013 Hershey National Track and Field Meet in 12.84 seconds. She attended Enterprise High School and broke the Utah state record high school record for the 200 metres with a time of 23.75 seconds.

Competing for Brigham Young University, BYU Gardner broke the 100 m and 200 m school records at the Robison Invitational in 2024, running 11.22 seconds for the 100m and 23.10 seconds for the 200 m. At the 2024 NCAA West Preliminaries in Fayetteville, Arkansas, she ran the 100 metres in a wind-assisted time of 11.03 seconds (+3.0 m/s), before running her next heat in 11.00 seconds (+2.1). She subsequently ran 11.24 seconds at the 2024 NCAA Division I Outdoor Track and Field Championships in Eugene, Oregon in June.

Gardner ran a 60 metres personal best of 7.13 seconds in Provo, Utah, in December 2025. She was a finalist in the 60 metres at the 2026 USA Indoor Track and Field Championships in New York in February 2026, running 7.22 seconds to place fourth in the final. She was selected to represent the United States over 60 metres at the 2026 World Athletics Indoor Championships in Toruń, Poland. On 24 July, she was a finalist at the 2026 USA Outdoor Track and Field Championships over 100 metres, placing fifth overall.

== Athletics achievements ==
Information from her World Athletics profile unless otherwise noted.

=== Personal bests ===
Type	Distance	Time (s)	Wind (m/s)	Venue	Date	Notes
Individual events
Indoor	60 metres	7.13	—N/a	Provo, United States	11 December 2025	
Indoor	200 metres sh	23.32	—N/a	Lubbock, United States	23 February 2024	
Indoor	300 metres	37.99	—N/a	Provo, United States	11 December 2025	
Outdoor	100 metres	11.01	+0.1	Provo, United States	29 April 2026	
Outdoor	200 metres	23.10	+0.2	Provo, United States	27 April 2024	
Team events
Outdoor	4 × 100 metres relay	43.84	—N/a	Sacramento, United States	27 May 2023	
Outdoor	Mixed 4 × 100 metres relay	40.93	—N/a	Gainesville, United States	4 April 2026	

=== International competitions ===
Representing the United States
Year	Competition	Venue	Position	Event	Time	Notes
2026	World Indoor Championships	Toruń, Poland	27th (h)	60 m	7.27 [.267]	

=== National championships and competitions ===
Year	Competition	Venue	Position	Event	Time	Notes
2017	USA U20 Championships	Sacramento, California	15th (h)	200 m	25.03	
2019	USA U20 Championships	Miramar, Florida	8th	100 m	11.65	
2023	NCAA Division I Championships	Austin, Texas	20th (sf)	4 × 100 m relay	44.60	
2024	NCAA Division I Championships	Eugene, Oregon	15th (sf)	100 m	11.24	
2024	U.S. Olympic Team Trials	Eugene, Oregon	34th (h)	100 m	11.56	
2026	USA Indoor Championships	New York, New York	4th	60 m	7.22	
2026	USA Championships	New York, New York	5th	100 m	11.03	
