= Crimson Cliffs High School =

School in Washington, Utah, United States

Coordinates: 37.0712°N 113.5094°W

Crimson Cliffs High School (CCHS) is a public high school in Washington, Utah. It is a part of the Washington County School District.

== History ==
It was scheduled to take attendance zone areas formerly assigned to Desert Hills High School and Pine View High School. The anticipated enrollment for fall 2019 was 750, including graduating middle school students from Crimson Cliffs Middle and students from the aforementioned high schools. The district deliberately moved teachers who were already teaching at those two schools to provide continuity for the students transferred from other high schools, and those teachers made up about half of the teachers at the time.

The school was named after the Crimson Cliffs area. The assistant principal, Mike Winslow, argued that, as paraphrased by Terell Wilkins of The Spectrum, "the naming the school [sic] was a relatively simple discussion".

The mustang was chosen as a mascot. Wilkins characterized the process for deciding that name as "lengthy".

== Athletics ==
When the American football team was established, several of its players had previously attended other high schools. The school's athletic staff focused on making them a cohesive team.

The COVID-19 pandemic in Utah, which progressed in the spring of 2020, interfered with the school's initial development of its athletic teams.
