= Hurricane High School =

Hurricane High School may refer to:

- Hurricane High School (Utah)
- Hurricane High School (West Virginia)
