= Donia Jessop =

American politician and mayor

Mayor of Hildale, Utah
- Incumbent
- Assumed office January 4, 2018
- Preceded by: Philip Barlow

Personal details
- Born: 1970 (age 55–56) Hildale, Utah
- Party: Independent
- Children: 1

Donia Jessop (born 1970) is an American politician who serves as the mayor of Hildale, Utah. Upon taking office, Jessop became the city’s first female mayor. For decades before Jessop's administration, Hildale was controlled by the Fundamentalist Church of Jesus Christ of Latter-Day Saints (FLDS Church). Jessop is Hildale's first mayor not endorsed by the FLDS Church.

== Early life and career ==
Jessop was born in 1970 in the Short Creek Community, which is the area made up of the municipalities of Hildale, Utah and Colorado City, Arizona. She grew up in the Fundamentalist Church of Jesus Christ of Latter-Day Saints (FLDS Church). At age 17, Jessop married her high school sweetheart. Though the marriage was not condoned by the FLDS Church, she continued to stay in the community and raise a family of ten children.

In 2002, Warren Jeffs became the leader of the FLDS Church and began to implement changes to life in the Short Creek Community, including excommunicating many church members. In 2012, Jessop, her husband, and all their children were excommunicated, except for one daughter. Rather than allow her family to be separated, Jessop and her family left the community and moved to Santa Clara, Utah, near the city of St. George.

While living in the St. George area, Jessop worked at The Learning Center for Families, a non-profit organization focused on childhood health and development.

== Activism and political career ==
In July 2016, Jessop and her family moved back to Hildale. As an excommunicated member, she was treated with hostility by FLDS Church members. This led her to co-found, along with other non-church members, the Short Creek Community Alliance, an organization to advocate for non-church members in the Short Creek Community.

Though she did not have any background in politics, Jessop decided to run for mayor in the November 2017 election against incumbent mayor Philip Barlow. At that time, Barlow and all of the city council were members of the FLDS Church. Jessop campaigned on a platform of increased tourism, beautification of Hildale, and having events organized by the city. On November 7, 2017, Jessop won with 129 votes to Barlow's 81.

On January 4, 2018, Jessop began her term as the first female mayor of Hildale, and the first mayor not endorsed by the FLDS Church. Initially, the city's existing government was hostile to her, locking her out of city hall, and with 15 city employees and board members resigning on the grounds that they did not want to work with a woman or with someone who had been excommunicated from the FLDS Church.

As mayor, Jessop has prioritized modernization, infrastructure, recreational facilities, and economic development. In 2019, she made a deal with Infab, a manufacturer of medical equipment, to build a factory in the town.

In 2020, USA Today named Jessop one of the ten most influential women in the history of Utah as part of its "Woman of the Century" series.

In 2021, Jessop campaigned for re-election against Hildale resident Jim Barlow. A major issue in the campaign was encouraging and adjusting to an increase in tourism in Hildale. She won re-election on November 2, 2021. In her second term, Jessop said she plans to focus on the city's water supply, paving and repairing roads, and providing resources to families.

Political offices
Preceded by Philip Barlow	Mayor of Hildale, Utah; 2018–present	Incumbent
