= Hurricane High School (Utah) =

Coordinates: 37°10′30″N 113°17′42″W

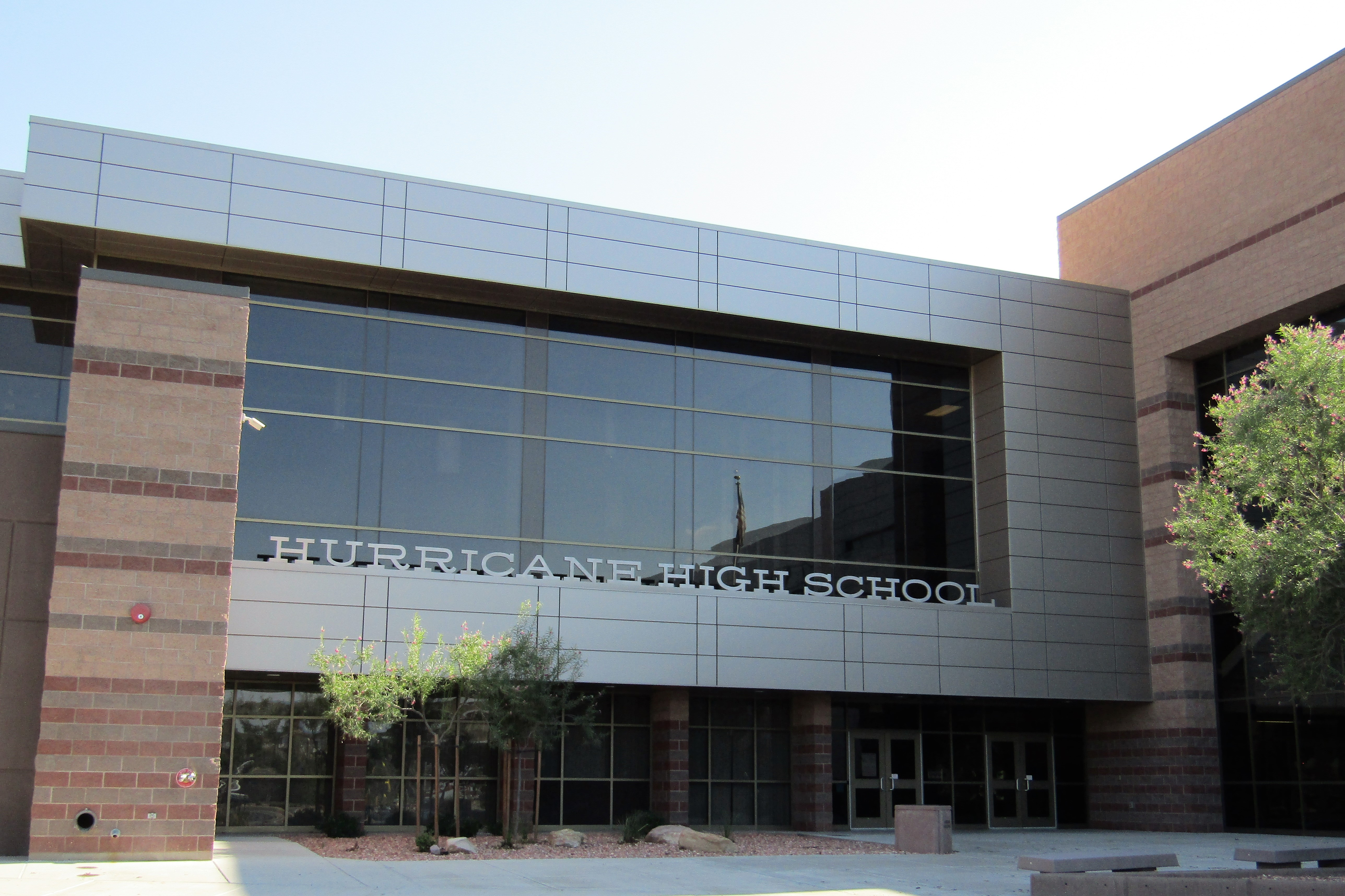

Location
- 345 W Tiger Blvd; Hurricane, Utah 84737; United States

Information
- Other names: HHS, H-Town
- Type: High School
- Motto: Preparing Students for Life
- Established: September 1918
- School district: Washington County School District (Utah)
- Principal: Daniel McKeehan
- Teaching staff: 46.39 (FTE)
- Grades: 10–12
- Enrollment: 1,164 (2023–2024)
- Student to teacher ratio: 25.09
- Colors: Red, Black and White
- Yearbook: Typhoon
- Website: hhs.washk12.org

Hurricane High School is the only high school in Hurricane, Utah, United States. It enrolls students in grades 10–12 from Hurricane and surrounding communities, including La Verkin, Toquerville, Hildale, Virgin, Rockville, and Springdale. As of the 2022 school year, there are 1,141 students enrolled. The student population has grown by 9% over the last five school years. In 2017, a total of 296 students graduated with an 89% graduation rate. USBE Data and Research 2017

Hurricane High's school colors are red, black and white. The school mascot is a tiger.

== History ==
The first school classes were held in Hurricane in 1906 in the living room of Ira E. Bradshaw's home, consisting of grades one through eight. Hurricane's first high school class graduated in the 1927–1928 (98 years ago) school year.

Photo of old Hurricane High School before its demolition in spring 2004. The building was listed on the National Register of Historic Places from April 9, 1986, to April 28, 2005, and was located at what eventually became the Hurricane City Fine Arts Building.

A two-story red brick high school building was built during the Great Depression with help from the federal government's Works Progress Administration. The building was completed and the school opened just after Thanksgiving in 1936.

The school chose the colors red and black because those are the colors on a hurricane warning flag. The school originally chose the Red Devil as its mascot in the mid-1920s, but many of the students' parents complained due to the big LDS church influence in the town.Shortly after the complaints from parents, the school then had a student vote between the Blue Jays, Black Pirates and Tigers. The students voted for the tiger as their new mascot, and it was an animal that could be rendered easily in black and red.

In 1974, a new gymnasium and three classrooms were completed at the school site. Students walked between the old high school building and the new building for classes. In 1978, classrooms and a cafeteria were added, and grades 9–12 moved to the new building. The old building remained in use for other grades until it was demolished in the spring of 2004. An auditorium, auxiliary gym, and administrative office areas were added in 1996. In 2001, a science hall was added and named for the outgoing principal, Robert Goulding.

The school's enrollment growth forced an expansion of the existing building. The expansion opened in 2012.

Daniel McKeehan is the principal at Hurricane High School, replacing former principal Darin Thomas in 2023.

=== Hurricane High School Principals ===
Principal	Years
Vivian Decker	1917–1918
A. L. Winsor	1918–1919
H. Val Hafen	1919–1921
Willard O. Nisson	1921–1924
Lorenzo Parker	1924–1928
Milton E. Moody	1928–1929
Glenn E. Snow	1929–1932
Leeman Bennett	1932–1938
Maurice Nuttal	1938–1958
J. Ordean Washborn	1958–1961
David R. Pearce	1961–1969
Wayne Edwards	1969–1983
Harold Tenney	1983–1985
Rob Goulding	1985–2001
Roy Hoyt	2001–2008
Kevin Pederson	2008–2012
Jody Rich	2012–2018
Darin Thomas	2018–2023
Daniel McKeehan	2023–present

== Athletics ==
Hurricane High is a 4A school and is a part of Region 9 of the Utah High School Activities Association, and has teams in baseball, basketball, cross country, football, golf, swimming, softball, tennis, track and field, volleyball, and wrestling. The school also has a speech and debate team, and students from the school's music programs participate in the UHSAA's Solo and Ensemble competitions. The school has long standing rivalries with Cedar High, Dixie High, Pine View High, Desert Hills High and Snow Canyon High in Region 9 sports. Including sporting events against Crimson Cliffs High School.

School State Championships:

- Baseball: 1 – 1956
- Boys Basketball: 2 – 1982, 2012
- Girls Basketball: 5 – 1988, 1989, 1993, 1994, 2000
- Football: 1 – 2011
- Boys Track: 8 – 1984, 1989, 1990, 2003, 2006, 2009, 2010, 2011
- Girls Track: 2 – 1984, 1993
- Volleyball: 2 – 2008, 2013

== See also ==
- List of high schools in Utah
