= Snow Canyon High School (Utah) =

Location
- 1385 North Lava Flow Drive; St. George, Utah 84770; United States
- Coordinates: 37°07′55″N 113°38′06″W

Information
- Other name: SCHS
- Type: Public high school
- School district: Washington County School District
- NCES School ID: 490114000206
- Principal: Kyle Campbell
- Teaching staff: 51.74 (on an FTE basis)
- Grades: 10–12
- Enrollment: 1,279 (2023–2024)
- Student to teacher ratio: 24.72
- Colors: Forest green, Vegas gold, navy blue
- Mascot: Warriors
- Website: schs.washk12.org

Snow Canyon High School (SCHS) is a public high school in St. George, Utah, United States. It is part of the Washington County School District. Zone: west St. George, Santa Clara and Ivins. As of January 2019, it serves 1,165 students making it the fourth largest high school in St. George and in the district.

== Athletics ==
The school competes in the 4A division in region 9 with all other Washington County schools, besides Enterprise High School. They also share the region with Cedar high school from Cedar City, Utah which is located in Iron County. Snow Canyon will remain in 4A Region 9 for the 2023–2025 classification period.

Snow Canyon is known for its baseball team's success, having won their 7th state championship in 2026. Six of the seven championships have come under Coach Reed Secrist.
