= United Effort Plan =

American charitable trust

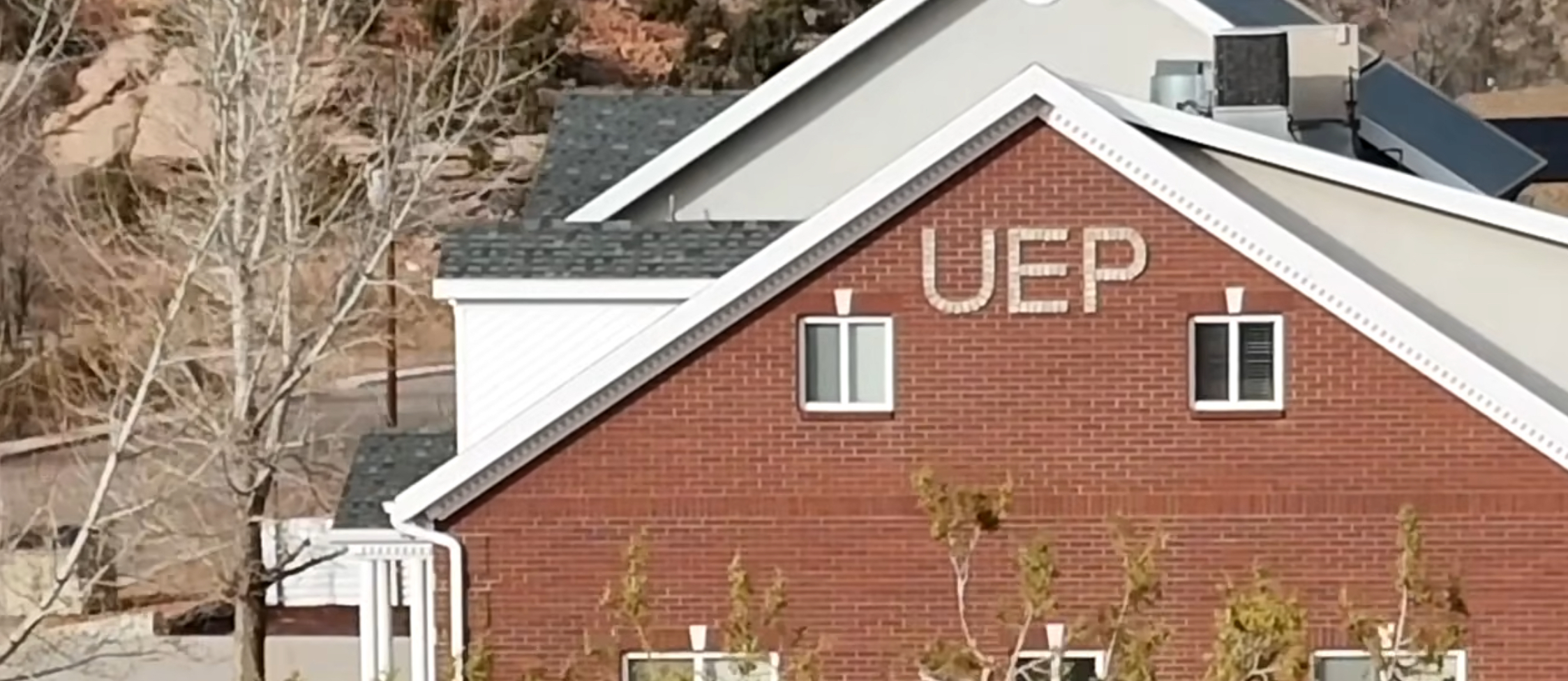
United Effort Plan Headquarters

The United Effort Plan also known as the UEP Trust is a charitable organization that was originally formed in 1942 as a subsidiary organization of the FLDS church. The organization is based in the Short Creek Community, comprising Hilldale, Utah and Colorado City, Arizona, which was primarily the base of the FLDS church until church leader Warren Jeffs was arrested in 2007. In 2005 the trust was seized after the Attorney General of Utah filed a lawsuit against the church.

== History ==
The United Effort Plan was founded in 1942 under the leadership of FLDS church founder John Y. Barlow. The church viewed this "United Order" as a means of living the traditional Latter Day Saint doctrine of the "Law of Consecration". This involved donating land, homes and businesses into a single trust with church leaders controlling and being able to distribute and seize properties to and from church members.

In 2005, the UEP was seized by the state of Utah following a lawsuit by the Attorney General. At the time, the UEP was worth $100 million. State control of the UEP ended in 2019, with the trust reformed into a "religiously neutral" entity benefiting the original donors and their heirs, including those who had left the FLDS Church.
