= Water Canyon High School =

Location
- 880 North Carling Street #520; Hildale, Utah 84784; United States; 37.004962°N 112.968067°W

Information
- Other name: WCHS
- Type: Public high school
- Motto: Building Tomorrow's Future
- Established: 2016
- School district: Washington County School District
- NCES School ID: 490114001521
- Principal: Steve Showalter
- Teaching staff: 19.33 (on an FTE basis)
- Grades: 7–12
- Enrollment: 311 (2024–2025)
- Student to teacher ratio: 16.09
- Colors: Orange and blue
- Mascot: Wildcat
- Nickname: Wildcats
- Accreditation: Cognia
- Website: wchs.washk12.org

Water Canyon High School (WCHS) is a public high school in Hildale, Utah, United States. It was established in 2016 and is part of the Washington County School District.

== History ==
Water Canyon High School was established in 2016, two years after the Water Canyon School was re-opened to pupils from grades Kindergarten to 12 in 2014. The Water Canyon School reverted to an elementary school, which it had been before it closed in 2001 due to comments from FLDS Church leader Warren Jeffs that caused enrollment to decrease by 75 percent.

== Athletics ==
Water Canyon High School competes in the 1A division in region 20 with other southern Utah schools in Beaver, Garfield, Kane, Piute, and Wayne counties. Water Canyon will remain in 1A Region 20 for the 2019-2021 classification period. While not in UHSAA competition with each other, Water Canyon High School maintains a rivalry with El Capitan High School.

== Demographics ==
Water Canyon High School is considered by the National Center for Education Statistics (NCES) to be Town – Distant (32), that is defined as territory inside an Urban Cluster that is more than 10 miles and less than or equal to 35 miles from an Urbanized Area. 2018–2019 race/ethnicity are:

- American Indian/Alaska Native — 0%
- Asian — .38%
- Black — 0%
- Hispanic — .38%
- Native Hawaiian/Pacific Islander — 0%
- White — 99.24%
- Two or more races — 0%
