= Western Christian High School =

Western Christian High School may refer to any of the following:

- Western Christian High School (Upland, California)
- Western Christian High School (Hull, Iowa)
- Western Christian High School (Phoenix, Arizona) (closed 1988)
