= Hildale, Utah =

City in Utah, United States

- City
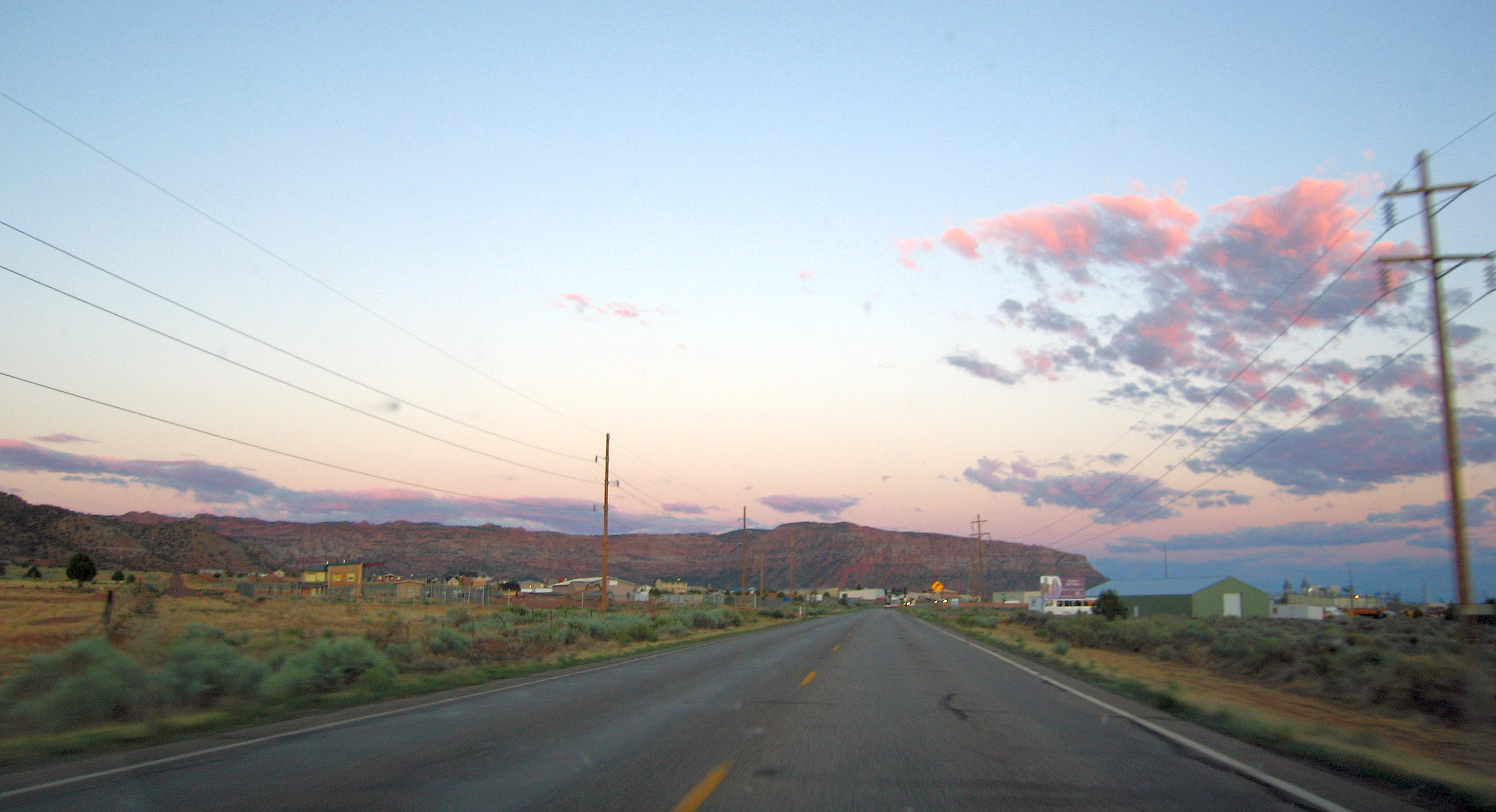
- Approaching Hildale in the evening from the northwest on Utah State Route 59

- Location in Washington County and the U.S. state of Utah
- Coordinates: 37°0′35″N 113°0′15″W
- Country: United States
- State: Utah
- County: Washington
- Founded: 1913
- Incorporated (town): December 9, 1963
- Incorporated (city): March 20, 1990

Government
  - Mayor: Donia Jessop

Area
  - Total: 9.053 sq mi (23.447 km^{2})
  - Land: 9.053 sq mi (23.447 km^{2})
  - Water: 0 sq mi (0.000 km^{2})
- Elevation: 5,128 ft (1,563 m)

Population (2020)
  - Total: 1,127
  - Estimate (2022): 1,184
  - Density: 211.3/sq mi (81.57/km^{2})
- Time zone: UTC–7 (Mountain (MST))
  - Summer (DST): UTC–6 (MDT)
- ZIP Code: 84784
- Area code: 435
- FIPS code: 49-35300
- GNIS feature ID: 2410763
- Sales tax: 6.45%
- Website: www.hildale.gov

Hildale is a city in Washington County, Utah, United States. The population was 1,127 at the 2020 census.

Hildale is located on the border of Utah and Arizona. It is notable for its history as a colony of Mormon polygamists.

== History ==
Hildale, formerly known as Short Creek Community, was founded in 1913 by members of the Council of Friends, a breakaway group from the Salt Lake City–based Church of Jesus Christ of Latter-day Saints (LDS Church). Hildale and its border city of Colorado City, Arizona, have an interwoven history with their shared claims of "Short Creek."

=== Early years ===
In 1914 a small school was built, followed by a post office. Much of Hildale's history is wrapped up in its association with the Fundamentalist Church of Jesus Christ of Latter-Day Saints (FLDS), and two additional polygamist breakoffs. Throughout the majority of its history, community members faced scrutiny and government intervention. In 1953 Arizona Governor John Howard Pyle ordered a raid of the surrounding community which led to many arrests. The following year, the Utah government attempted the same. The two events are collectively known as The Short Creek raids. Utah continued its enforcement by separating children from Families, starting with the family of Vera Black.

The FLDS church's private trust, which evolved into a charitable trust, was the United Effort Plan. A major component of that trust included members of the church "consecrating", or donating, their property to the trust, with the understanding it would be put to its best use. Because of this practice, and increasing wealth that the trust purchased property, a vast majority of the real property in Hildale was controlled by single legal entity which wielded quite a bit of power, and influenced land-use decisions. The majority of the area was developed as very low-density, with large homes to accommodate complex family structures, and a great deal of agricultural land. After the trust's control was taken by Utah in 2005, then transitioned back to a board, the large square footage homes that originally housed multiple families, has complicated the homes being transitioned back for private use.

Hildale eventually incorporated as a town in 1963, and a city in 1990.

=== Warren Jeffs controversy ===
In January 2004 Warren Jeffs, the Prophet of the FLDS church and a major community leader, consolidated power within the UEP, and the church. This included the excommunication of many male members of the faith group, who were then expected to leave the community immediately, since their land and homes were operated by the Trust. While this practice had affected the city in small numbers before, this singular event led to increased attention to the community, and scrutiny of the Trust's control. When Jeffs was later accused of federal crimes in 2005, and became a fugitive, the Utah attorney general's office temporarily seized control of the assets of the Trust (which also included land in Arizona, Texas, British Columbia and elsewhere.)

On April 6, 2010, Arizona officials executed search warrants at governmental offices of the towns of Colorado City, Arizona and Hildale, Utah. According to one report, the warrants involved the misuse of funds and caused the Hildale Public Safety Department to be shut down. According to another report, city personnel and volunteers were ordered out of the buildings while the search was being conducted, prompting protests from Colorado City Fire Chief Jake Barlow. Then in June 2014, the Arizona Office of the Attorney General filed a motion in U.S. District Court seeking to dissolve the local police forces and "the disbandment of the Colorado City, Arizona/Hildale, Utah Marshal's Office and the appointment of a federal monitor over municipal functions and services." As the basis for the legal proceeding, the Arizona Attorney General stated that "[t]he disbandment of the Colorado City/Hildale Marshal's Office is necessary and appropriate because this police department has operated for decades, and continues to operate, as the de facto law enforcement arm of the FLDS Church."

=== Flash flood ===
During a flash flood on September 14, 2015, at least 12 members of two related families from the community were killed while stopped in a low water crossing at the mouth of Maxwell Canyon in Hildale. A thirteenth person was still missing as of March 16, 2021. The flooding resulted from the moisture from Hurricane Linda.

=== Religious discrimination charges ===
In 2016, in United States V. Town of Colorado City Arizona, of which Hildale was also a defendant, the jury found that both cities, and associated corporations had violated various provisions of the Policing Act, The Fair Housing Act, and had multiple violations of discrimination against people who were not in good favor of the FLDS church, and its leaders.

“engaged in a pattern or practice of conduct that violated the federal Fair Housing Act by:” making housing unavailable or denying housing opportunities to individuals because of religion[;] discriminating against non-FLDS individuals in the terms, conditions, or privileges of the sale or rental of a dwelling, or in the provision of services or facilities in connection therewith, because of religion[; and] coercing, intimidating, threatening, or interfering with an individual in the exercise or enjoyment of the right to equal housing opportunities or the right to equal treatment in the terms, conditions, privileges, and services in connection with housing, or on account of that individual having aided or encouraged any other person in the exercise or enjoyment of those rights.

— UNITED STATES OF AMERICA, vs. TOWN OF COLORADO CITY, ARIZONA, et al

=== Post-Warren Jeffs leadership ===
The Hildale land held by the UEP, under government oversight, was being offered to beneficiaries who could prove they had possessed the land, or otherwise had valid claims to it. Distrust of government officials left much of the land unclaimed. People who had left the FLDS church in previous decades, including some "lost boys", began returning to accept these claims which has led to a major population shift.

In 2017, Donia Jessop who had left the church and returned just the year before to Hildale, ran successfully for mayor. This was the first time in the community's history that both a woman had been elected, and the first time a non-member of the FLDS faith had been elected. The election received major pushback, with the current serving government initially locking her out of the offices and refusing her entry. 15 employees and board members would go on to resign before she was sworn in, refusing to work with her. In 2018, on the day of her swearing in, in an act of protest, all the remaining city council members who were within the FLDS church resigned. Combined with the few newly sworn in City council members who were not FLDS, the result was a new mayor with a completely replaced city council following special elections to fill the vacated seats.

While the population decreased significantly between 2010 and 2015, since this transition of leadership, efforts have been made to both welcome and provide resources to people who leave the faith, but also invite all who have moved away to return to the community. This has included working alongside Colorado City leaders, who have made similar efforts to make their community more open to outsiders, including a large branch of Mohave Community college, and the opening of the communities' first bars.

== Geography ==
According to the United States Census Bureau, the city has a total area of 9.053 square miles (23.45 km^{2}), all land.

=== Climate ===
According to the Köppen Climate Classification system, Hildale has a semi-arid climate, abbreviated "BSk" on climate maps.

== Demographics ==
Historical population
Census	Pop.	Note	%±
1970	480		—
1980	1,009		110.2%
1990	1,325		31.3%
2000	1,895		43.0%
2010	2,726		43.9%
2020	1,127		−58.7%
2022 (est.)	1,184		5.1%
U.S. Decennial Census; 2020 Census

=== Racial and ethnic composition ===
Hildale city, Utah – Racial composition Note: the US Census treats Hispanic/Latino as an ethnic category. This table excludes Latinos from the racial categories and assigns them to a separate category. Hispanics/Latinos may be of any race.
Race (NH = Non-Hispanic)	% 2020	% 2010	% 2000	Pop 2020	Pop 2010	Pop 2000
White alone (NH)	96.3%	99.2%	95.9%	1,085	2,704	1,818
Black alone (NH)	0%	0%	0.2%	0	1	4
American Indian alone (NH)	0.3%	0.1%	0.5%	3	2	9
Asian alone (NH)	0.1%	0%	0.6%	1	0	12
Pacific Islander alone (NH)	0%	0%	0.6%	0	1	12
Other race alone (NH)	0.1%	0%	0.3%	1	0	6
Multiracial (NH)	0.4%	0.2%	0.8%	4	6	15
Hispanic/Latino (any race)	2.9%	0.4%	1%	33	12	19

=== 2020 census ===
As of the 2020 census, Hildale had a population of 1,127. The median age was 20.3 years. 44.0% of residents were under the age of 18 and 6.9% of residents were 65 years of age or older. For every 100 females there were 107.6 males, and for every 100 females age 18 and over there were 96.0 males age 18 and over.

0.0% of residents lived in urban areas, while 100.0% lived in rural areas.

There were 228 households in Hildale, of which 69.3% had children under the age of 18 living in them. Of all households, 48.2% were married-couple households, 17.1% were households with a male householder and no spouse or partner present, and 24.6% were households with a female householder and no spouse or partner present. About 9.2% of all households were made up of individuals and 5.2% had someone living alone who was 65 years of age or older.

There were 264 housing units, of which 13.6% were vacant. The homeowner vacancy rate was 0.7% and the rental vacancy rate was 8.7%.

The most reported ancestries in 2020 were English (44.5%), German (3.9%), and Irish (2.1%).

Racial composition as of the 2020 census
Race	Number	Percent
White	1,099	97.5%
Black or African American	0	0.0%
American Indian and Alaska Native	3	0.3%
Asian	1	0.1%
Native Hawaiian and Other Pacific Islander	0	0.0%
Some other race	17	1.5%
Two or more races	7	0.6%
Hispanic or Latino (of any race)	33	2.9%

=== 2000 census ===
As of the 2000 census, there were 1,895 people, 232 households, and 215 families residing in the city. The population density was 644.2 per square mile (248.9/km^{2}). There were 243 housing units at an average density of 82.6 per square mile (31.9/km^{2}). The racial makeup of the city was 96.41% White, 0.21% African American, 0.47% Native American, 0.63% Asian, 0.63% Pacific Islander, 0.84% from other races, and 0.79% from two or more races. Hispanic or Latino of any race were 1.00% of the population.

There were 232 households, out of which 76.7% had children under 18 living with them, 82.3% were married couples living together, 8.6% had a female householder with no husband present, and 6.9% were non-families. 6.0% of all households were made up of individuals, and 4.3% had someone living alone who was 65 years of age or older. The average household size was 8.17, and the average family size was 8.10.

In the city, the population was spread out, with 63.6% under 18, 8.8% from 18 to 24, 18.4% from 25 to 44, 6.3% from 45 to 64, and 2.8% who were 65 years of age or older. The median age was 13 years. For every 100 females, there were 96.2 males. For every 100 females aged 18 and over, there were 75.8 males.

The median income for a household in the city was $32,679, and the median income for a family was $31,750. Males had a median income of $25,170 versus $16,071 for females. The per capita income for the city was $4,782. About 37.0% of families and 41.2% of the population were below the poverty line, including 42.0% of those under age 18 and 31.8% of those aged 65 or over.

== Government ==
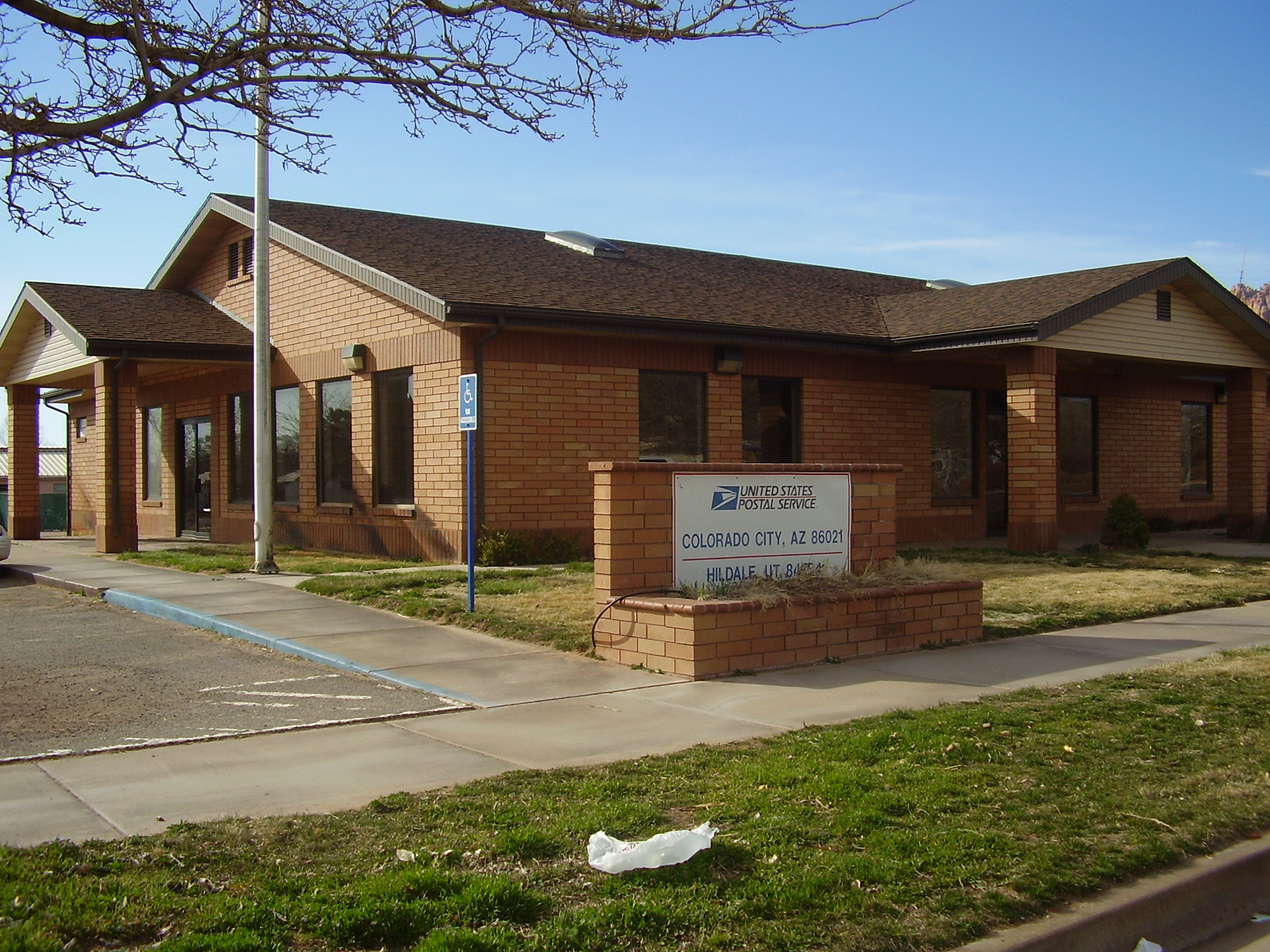
Colorado City, AZ/Hildale, UT Post Office

In January 2018, the city's first female mayor, Donia Jessop, was sworn in along with a new city council. This also marked the first time positions in city government have been held by people who are not members of the Fundamentalist Church of Jesus Christ of Latter-Day Saints. About a month afterward, 11 city employees resigned, at least one of whom said that his religion prevented him from "following a woman, and from serving on a board with apostates."

The town is policed by the Colorado City/Hilldale Police Department.

== Education ==
Hildale is within the Washington County School District.

The earliest school, when the city was founded in 1914 was across the border, funded by Mohave County, Arizona. Various schools were built and used, by 1998, the city's elementary-age students attended the Phelps School in Hildale while many older students attended school in Colorado City Unified School District in Arizona. In early 2000, local religious leaders encouraged families to withdraw their children from public schools, with over a thousand students transitioning to homeschool across all grades, similarly, the schools saw major teacher resignations which effectively led to their closures. Utah contracted with Arizona for remaining public school students to attend schools across the border.

In 2014 Washington County School District purchased the old Phelps Elementary Building and a building next to it. After a quick remodel, the old Phelps Elementary School was reopened as Water Canyon School, which originally served K-12. Two years later, the building next to Phelps was completed, and opened as Water Canyon High School. The completion of the high school allowed Water Canyon School to become K-8. By 2020 Enrollment had increased significantly and the school expanded with a new Career and technical education building and athletic facilities. In 2021, Utah Tech University opened an extension campus within the high school.

== See also ==
- List of cities and towns in Utah
