= Enterprise, Utah =

City in Utah, United States

- City
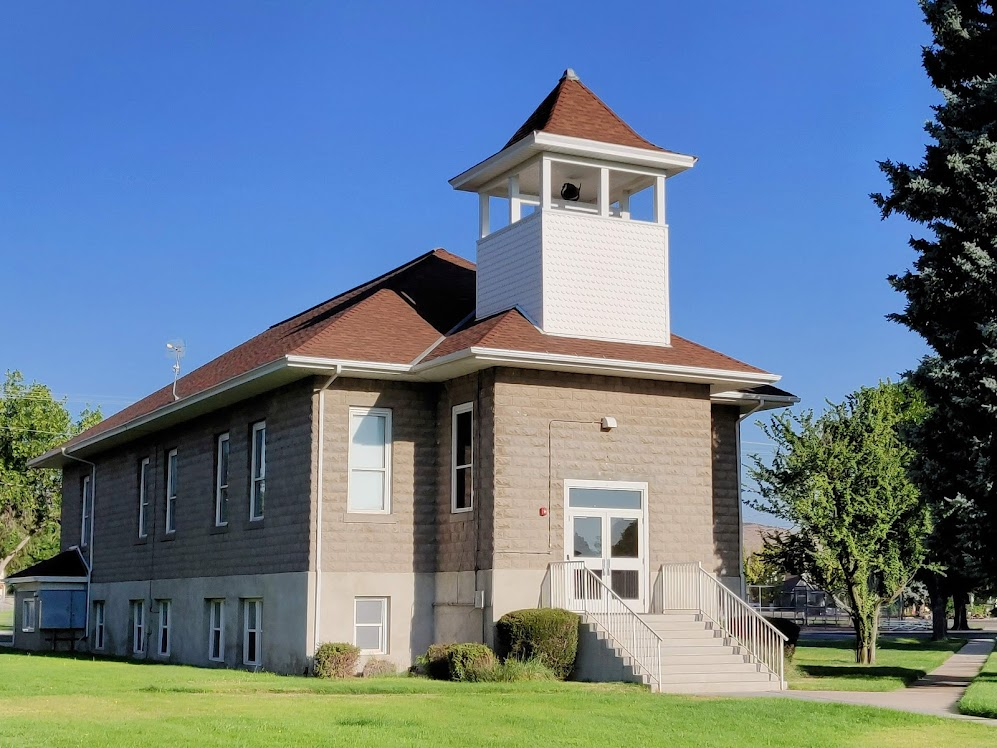
- Heritage Hall

- Location in Washington County and the state of Utah
- Coordinates: 37°34′22″N 113°45′40″W
- Country: United States
- State: Utah
- County: Washington
- Founded: 1891
- Founder: Orson Huntsman

Area
  - Total: 8.73 sq mi (22.62 km^{2})
  - Land: 8.73 sq mi (22.62 km^{2})
  - Water: 0 sq mi (0.00 km^{2})
- Elevation: 5,371 ft (1,637 m)

Population (2020)
  - Total: 2,027
  - Density: 216.4/sq mi (83.54/km^{2})
- Time zone: UTC-7 (Mountain (MST))
  - Summer (DST): UTC-6 (MDT)
- ZIP code: 84725
- Area code: 435
- FIPS code: 49-23420
- GNIS feature ID: 2410446
- Website: enterpriseutah.org

Enterprise is a city in northwestern Washington County, Utah, United States. The population was 2,027 at the 2020 census.

== History ==
A post office called Enterprise has been in operation since 1899. It was settled largely by residents of the town of Hebron, later abandoned. The town was so named for the settlers' enterprising plan to find a water supply. Cattle ranchers thrived in the area, but the town needed a consistent water supply to sustain themselves and for agriculture to spread. The settlers decided to take on the ambitious project of constructing a dam. Many thought that the dam would be impossible to accomplish and left the area. The rest of the settlers began work on the dam. With a lot of work and little return, the dam was completed, and the reservoir has supported the town ever since.

== Geography ==
Enterprise is located on the south rim of the Great Basin.

According to the United States Census Bureau, the city has a total area of 2.9 square miles (7.5 km^{2}), all land.

The hillside letter E can be seen in the southwest. (37.5525°N 113.7484°W).

The 17 November 17, 1902 Pine Valley earthquake, with a maximum Mercalli intensity of VIII (Severe), destroyed almost all chimneys in Pine Valley and Santa Clara. Some building damage occurred at St. George. This event was felt in Salt Lake City.

=== Climate ===
According to the Köppen Climate Classification system, Enterprise has a semi-arid climate, abbreviated "BSk" on climate maps.

Climate data for Enterprise, Utah (1991–2020)
Month	Jan	Feb	Mar	Apr	May	Jun	Jul	Aug	Sep	Oct	Nov	Dec	Year
Mean daily maximum °F (°C)	42.0 (5.6)	46.7 (8.2)	56.6 (13.7)	63.5 (17.5)	72.6 (22.6)	83.3 (28.5)	89.7 (32.1)	87.3 (30.7)	80.9 (27.2)	67.3 (19.6)	53.7 (12.1)	42.0 (5.6)	65.5 (18.6)
Daily mean °F (°C)	30.4 (−0.9)	33.3 (0.7)	41.4 (5.2)	46.9 (8.3)	55.8 (13.2)	65.7 (18.7)	72.9 (22.7)	70.9 (21.6)	62.7 (17.1)	49.9 (9.9)	38.4 (3.6)	29.5 (−1.4)	49.8 (9.9)
Mean daily minimum °F (°C)	18.7 (−7.4)	20.0 (−6.7)	26.2 (−3.2)	30.3 (−0.9)	39.0 (3.9)	48.2 (9.0)	56.0 (13.3)	54.5 (12.5)	44.5 (6.9)	32.5 (0.3)	23.0 (−5.0)	16.9 (−8.4)	34.2 (1.2)
Average precipitation inches (mm)	1.52 (39)	1.97 (50)	1.90 (48)	1.00 (25)	0.93 (24)	0.47 (12)	1.04 (26)	1.22 (31)	0.95 (24)	1.53 (39)	1.12 (28)	1.58 (40)	15.23 (386)
Average snowfall inches (cm)	5.3 (13)	6.2 (16)	2.5 (6.4)	1.6 (4.1)	0.1 (0.25)	0.0 (0.0)	0.0 (0.0)	0.0 (0.0)	0.0 (0.0)	0.6 (1.5)	2.3 (5.8)	6.4 (16)	25 (63.05)
Source: NOAA

== Demographics ==
Historical population
Census	Pop.	Note	%±
1890	41		—
1900	100		143.9%
1910	350		250.0%
1920	608		73.7%
1930	548		−9.9%
1940	677		23.5%
1950	790		16.7%
1960	859		8.7%
1970	844		−1.7%
1980	905		7.2%
1990	936		3.4%
2000	1,285		37.3%
2010	1,711		33.2%
2020	2,027		18.5%
U.S. Decennial Census

=== 2020 census ===
As of the 2020 census, Enterprise had a population of 2,027. The median age was 28.7 years. 38.8% of residents were under the age of 18 and 13.3% of residents were 65 years of age or older.

For every 100 females there were 109.2 males, and for every 100 females age 18 and over there were 101.3 males age 18 and over.

0.0% of residents lived in urban areas, while 100.0% lived in rural areas.

There were 580 households in Enterprise, of which 50.2% had children under the age of 18 living in them. Of all households, 72.8% were married-couple households, 11.0% were households with a male householder and no spouse or partner present, and 14.0% were households with a female householder and no spouse or partner present. About 12.5% of all households were made up of individuals and 5.8% had someone living alone who was 65 years of age or older.

There were 617 housing units, of which 6.0% were vacant. The homeowner vacancy rate was 1.0% and the rental vacancy rate was 2.2%.

Racial composition as of the 2020 census
Race	Number	Percent
White	1,893	93.4%
Black or African American	1	0.0%
American Indian and Alaska Native	18	0.9%
Asian	9	0.4%
Native Hawaiian and Other Pacific Islander	2	0.1%
Some other race	44	2.2%
Two or more races	60	3.0%
Hispanic or Latino (of any race)	98	4.8%

=== 2000 census ===
As of the census of 2000, there were 1,285 people, 378 households, and 317 families residing in the town. The population density was 441.0 people per square mile (170.5/km^{2}). There were 454 housing units at an average density of 155.8 per square mile (60.2/km^{2}). The racial makeup of the town was 95.25% White, 2.49% Native American, 0.23% Asian, 0.78% from other races, and 1.25% from two or more races. Hispanic or Latino of any race were 1.17% of the population.

There were 378 households, out of which 49.5% had children under the age of 18 living with them, 73.8% were married couples living together, 7.4% had a female householder with no husband present, and 16.1% were non-families. 15.1% of all households were made up of individuals, and 9.3% had someone living alone who was 65 years of age or older. The average household size was 3.40, and the average family size was 3.82.

In the town, the population was spread out, with 40.0% under 18, 8.9% from 18 to 24, 21.3% from 25 to 44, 18.0% from 45 to 64, and 11.8% who were 65 years of age or older. The median age was 26 years. For every 100 females, there were 100.8 males. For every 100 females aged 18 and over, there were 101.8 males.

The median income for a household in the town was $35,694, and the median income for a family was $38,500. Males had a median income of $31,905 versus $16,354 for females. The per capita income was $13,858. About 4.3% of families and 6.1% of the population were below the poverty line, including 4.8% of those under age 18 and 5.0% of those aged 65 or over.

== Arts and culture ==
Enterprise is hosts an annual Cornfest, where the town and neighboring communities celebrate the harvest of local farmers in late August. Founded in 1990, Cornfest features freshly grown corn, a vintage car show, live entertainment and dancing, festival food, and shopping booths.

== Government ==
Mayor is Brandon Humphries. City Manager is Adam Bowler.

== Education ==
Enterprise is home to two schools, Enterprise Elementary School (K-6) and Enterprise High School (7–12).

== Notable people ==
- Patricia T. Holland - American educator, writer and religious leader. Born and raised in Enterprise.
- Jaslyn Gardner - American Sprinter. Grew up in Enterprise and ran track at Enterprise High School (Utah).

== Gallery ==
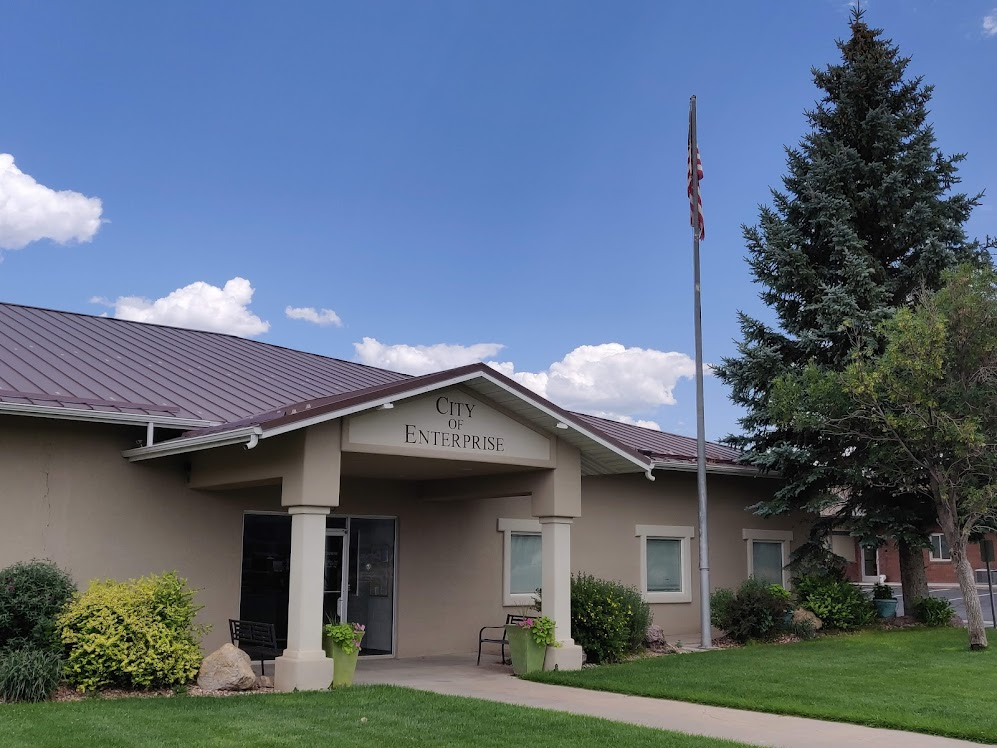
Enterprise Utah City Offices

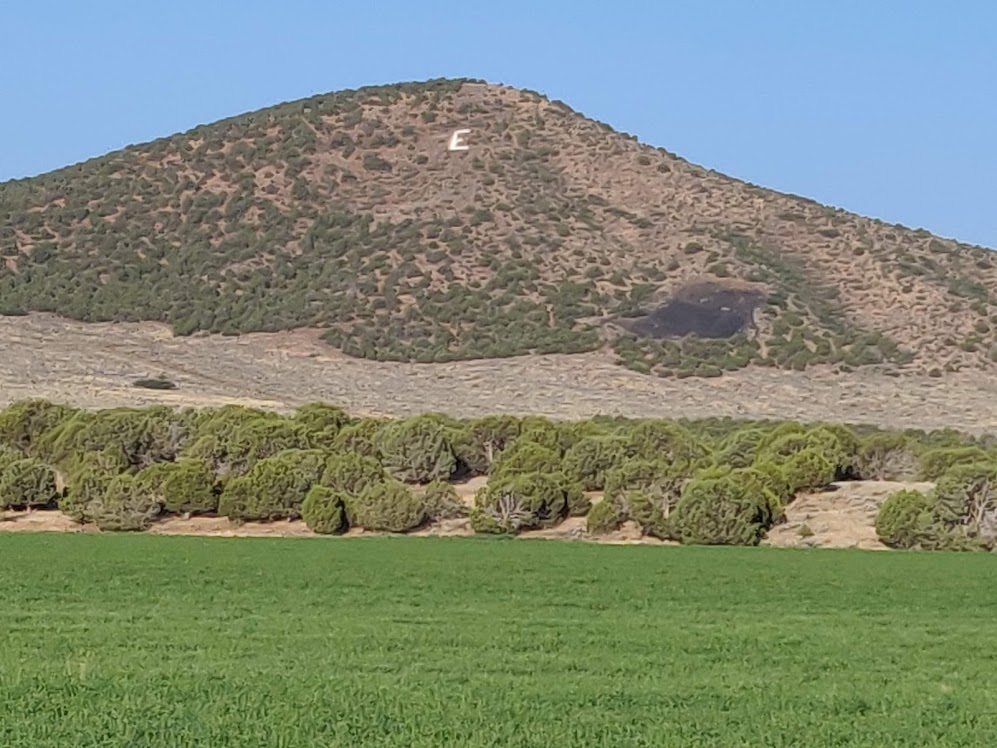
Enterprise Utah E Hill

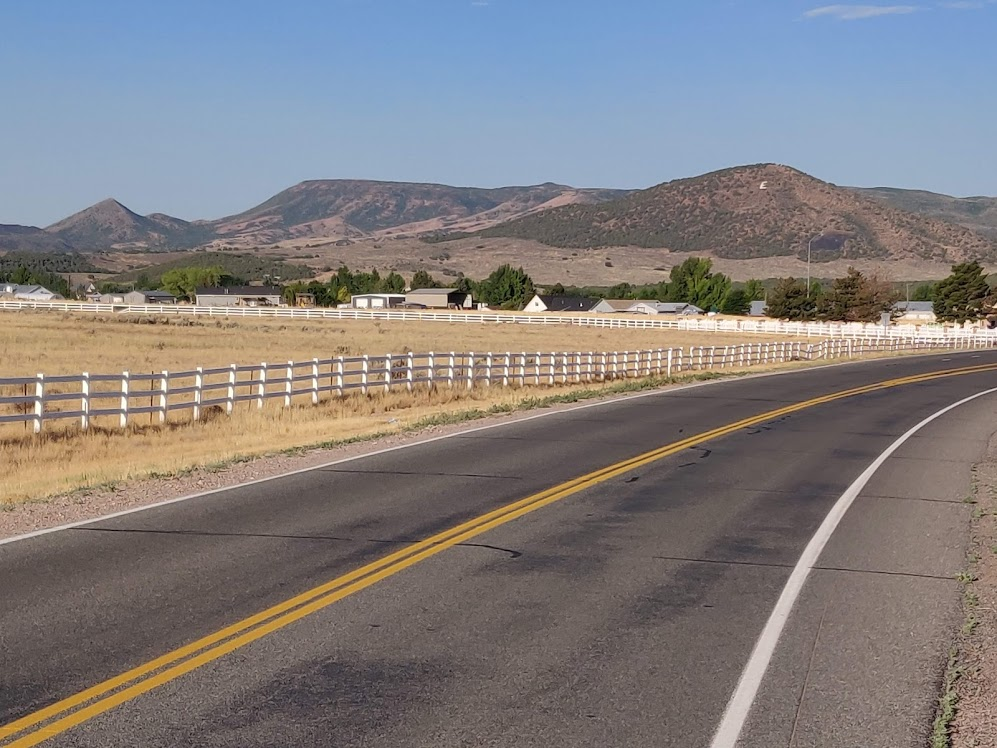
Enterprise Utah E Hill, Flat Top, & Pilot Peak

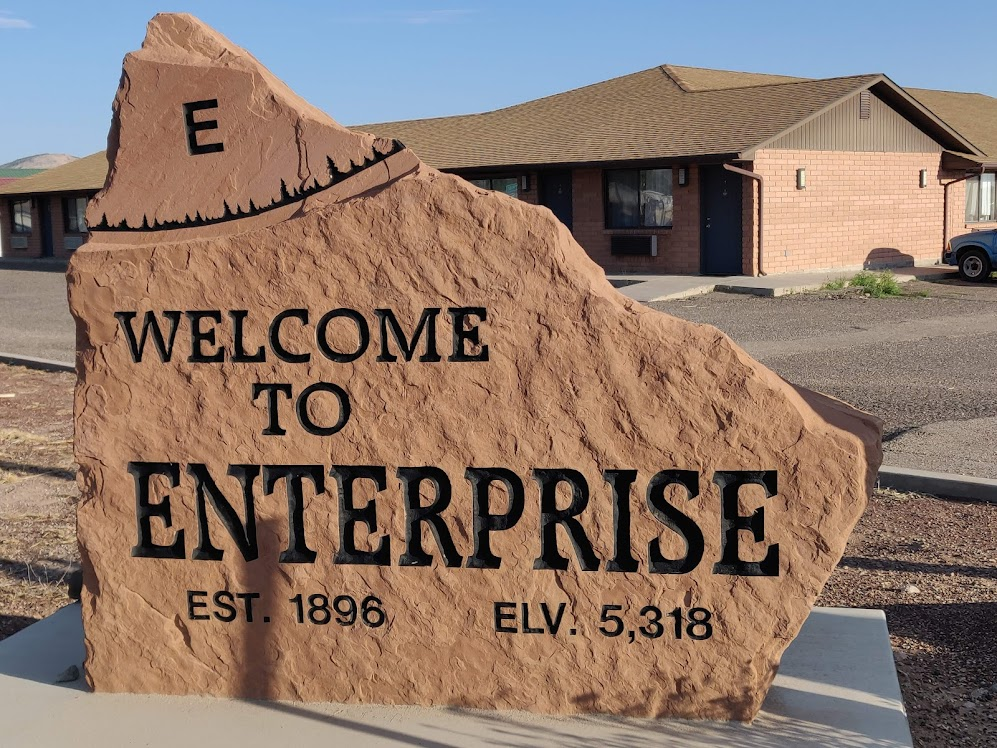
Welcome to Enterprise Sign

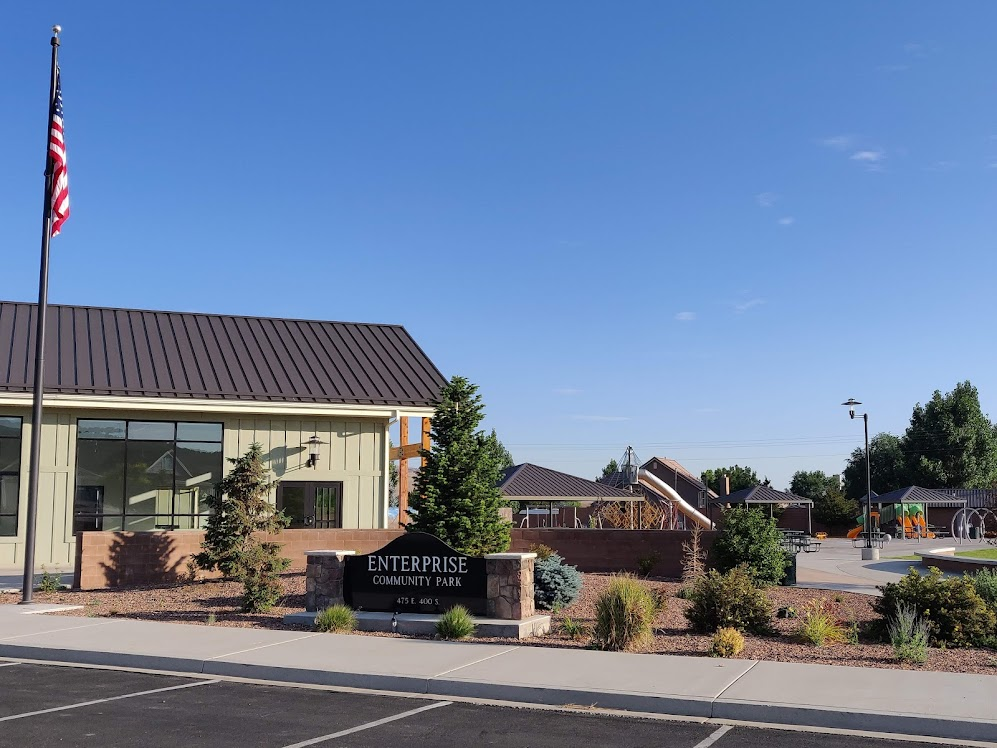
Enterprise Community Park

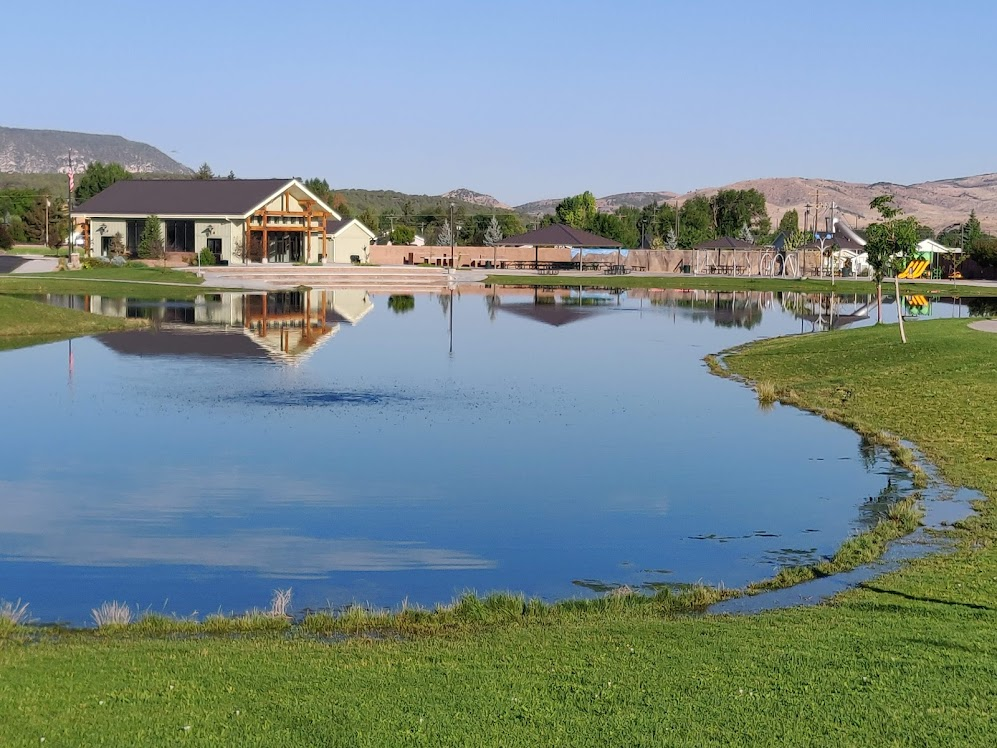
Enterprise Community Park & Pond

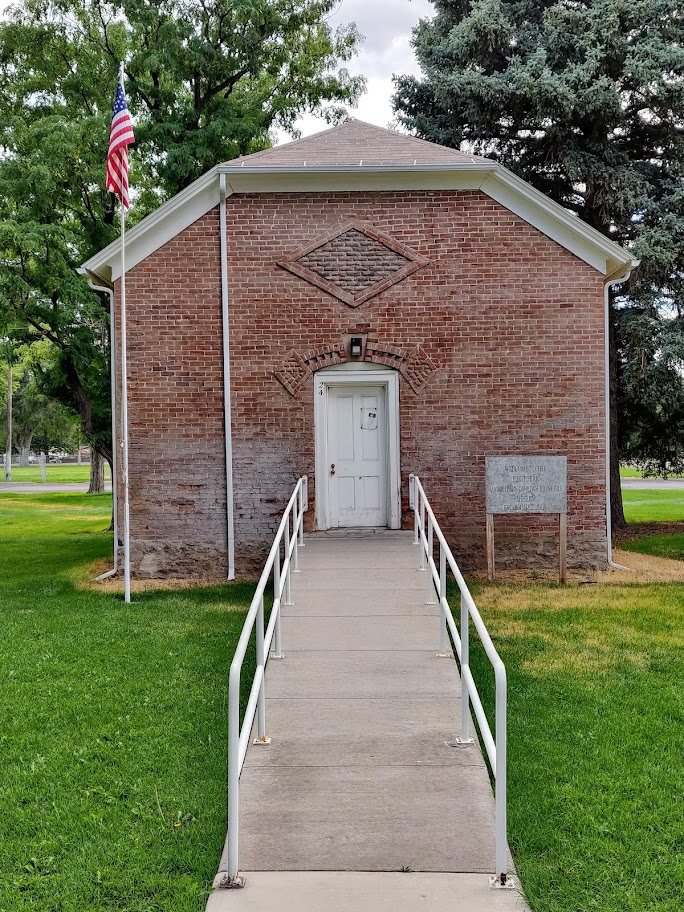
Enterprise Daughters of the Utah Pioneers

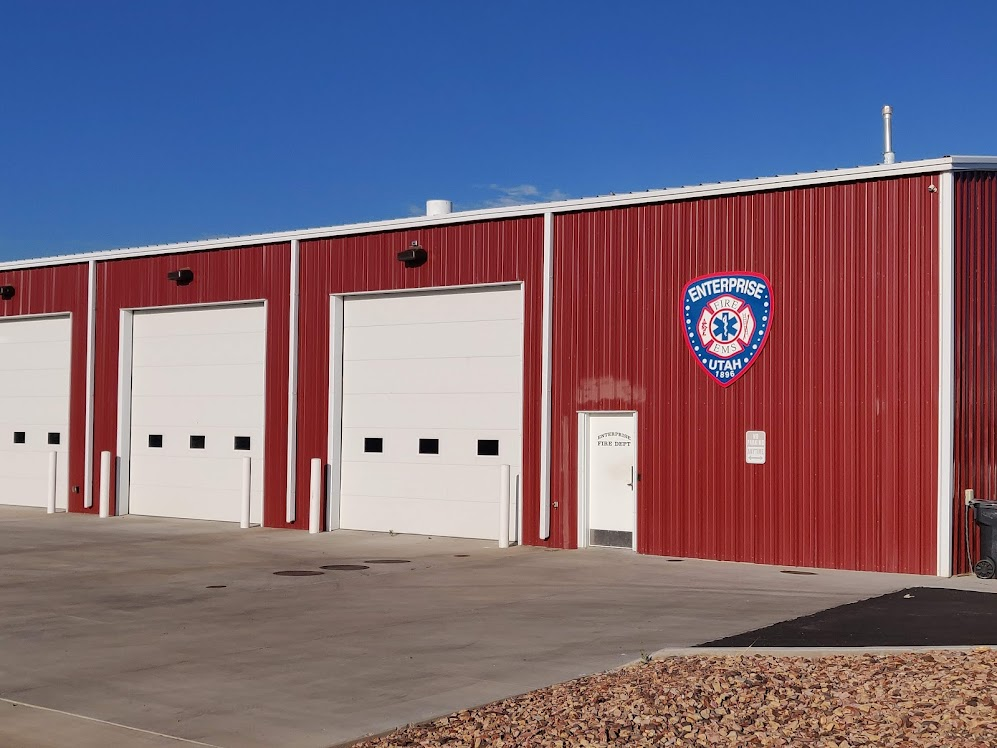
Enterprise Fire Station

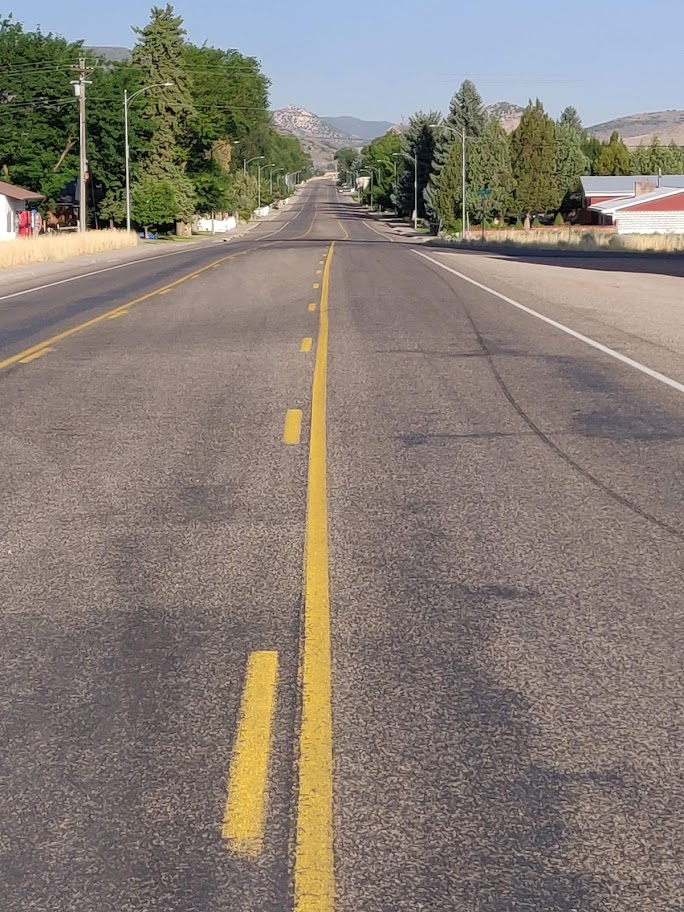
View Down Mainstreet

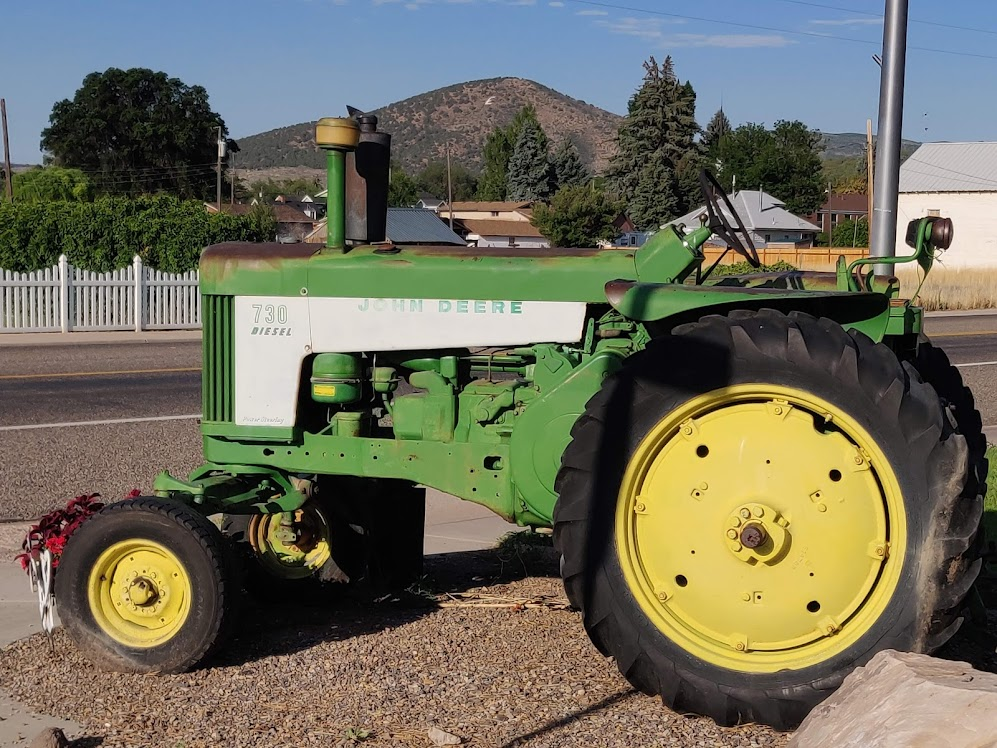
Farm Tractor and E Hill

== See also ==
- List of cities and towns in Utah
