= Pine View High School =

Location
- 2850 E 750 N St. George, Utah 84790; United States; 37°07′10″N 113°31′33″W

Information
- Other name: PVHS
- Type: Public
- Motto: It is simple in nature yet precise in belief and direction.
- Established: 1983
- School district: Washington County School District
- Principal: Brett Gifford
- Assistant Principal: Renee Taylor
- Athletic Director: Ryan Christiansen
- Resource Officer: Officer Lynn Koester
- Faculty: 51.86 (on FTE basis)
- Grades: 10 to 12
- Enrollment: 1,136 (2023–2024)
- Student to teacher ratio: 21.91
- Colors: Maroon, silver and black
- Mascot: Panther
- Nickname: Home of the Panthers!
- Website: Pine View High School website

Pine View High School is a high school located in St. George, Utah, United States. As of 2022, the school had a total of 1,143 students. It is a part of the Washington County School District.

== History ==
The school opened in August 1983, and was the second high school to open in St. George. The name Pine View beat out four other finalists: Cotton Mill, Panorama, Mill Creek, and Red Hills. The nickname Panthers was also selected above the other finalists, which included Minotaurs, Trojans, Knights, and Pumas.

== Sports ==
Pine View competes as a 4A school in Region 9, and will remain so at least until 2026, depending on region and class realignment. Pine View secured its first state championship of any kind in 1992. The women's track team won the state title, led by future Olympic heptathlete Tiffany Lott. This was the first of four straight state championships, culminating in the 1995 double track titles by the men's and women's track teams, with the women winning by a record margin of 71 points (152 to 81).

In 2003, the Pine View baseball team won its first ever state championship with an impressive 23–1 season. In 2010, the boys' cross country team won the Utah 4A State Championship.

In the 2013–2014 football season, Pine View advanced to the Utah State 3A championship, but lost the Championship against Desert Hills High School.

In 1998, Pine View hired 74-year-old Sark Arslanian as the football coach. His pay was just $1 per year. In 2000, he suffered a heart attack and had quadruple bypass surgery. Arslanian was previously a Weber State and Colorado State football coach. Pine View replaced Arslanian with Ray Hosner in 2001, who during his tenure has taken the Panthers to three state championship games. Shortly before the 2022 football season began, Ray Hosner announced he would be taking a year off from coaching the football team, as he had to have surgery during the off season. The football team proceeded to have its worst season in school history without Ray Hosner, resulting in a record of 0–9 in the 2022 season. The previous worst football seasons in Pine View history were one win seasons in both 1995 and 1983.

== Programs ==
=== Fine arts ===
Pine View High School's fine arts include multiple forms of musical talents, vocal, and theatrical performances. Every year, Pine View Theatre holds two live performances. In the fall, Pine View produces and performs a musical with a full orchestra pit, and in the spring a play with no musical elements.

== Notable alumni ==
- Tyler Robinson (2021), alleged assassin of Charlie Kirk
