= Ashmolean Museum University Engagement Programme =

UK Oxford museum teaching programme

The University Engagement Programme (UEP) of the Ashmolean Museum was established at the University of Oxford in 2012 with funding from the Andrew W. Mellon Foundation. Its purpose is to explore new avenues for the use of the Museum's collections in the teaching of the university.

== Programme ==
The UEP employed three Teaching Curators and a Programme Director, each with a different specialism: Dr Senta German (Aegean Archaeology), Dr Mallica Kumbera Landrus (History of art and architecture in South Asia) and Dr Jim Harris (European Sculpture c.1350-1620); and Dr Giovanna Vitelli (17th-century colonial archaeology and early collecting). The Teaching Curators work closely with the Ashmolean's Curatorial Departments, Western Art, Eastern Art, Antiquities and the Heberden Coin Room, their specialisms broadly reflecting these divisions.

The programme seeks to develop partnerships with faculties across the full range of disciplines taught at Oxford. These partnerships have tended to begin in discussion with individual academics who may then bring a group of students to the Museum to examine objects that shed light, directly or tangentially, on the subject of their study. The handling and close examination of objects is central to the work of the Ashmolean UEP, permitting students insights unavailable when the same things are seen in the context of a museum display. From the starting point of object-led work undertaken with individual members of faculty, the UEP seeks to embed interdisciplinary, Museum-based teaching in the curricula of the university.

Whereas the Ashmolean has a long and continuing tradition of teaching by its Curators, this cross-disciplinary approach has resulted in a significant increase in the number of students and faculty visiting and using the Museum. In the course of its first full year of operation, 2012–13, the members of the UEP taught almost 1200 students in 21 departments of the university, at every level from first year undergraduate to DPhil and in every mode from individual tutorials to seminars and lectures.

By the end of Trinity (Summer) term 2013, the UEP had undertaken teaching with faculty colleagues from three of the four major divisions of the university: Humanities, Medical Sciences and Social Sciences, engaging with the departments of Buddhist Studies, Classics, English Language and Literature, Hindi Language, Hindu Studies, History, History of Art, Italian, Sanskrit, Theology and Religion, Neuroscience, Cardiovascular Medicine, Psychiatry, Experimental Psychology, Anthropology, Archaeology, Education, Geography and the Environment, International Development, the Ruskin School of Drawing and Fine Art and the Saïd Business School.

As the largest project of its kind in a UK university museum, the Ashmolean UEP is involved in wider discussions concerning object-based learning as a tool for teaching and research and its members have collaborated in events organised by the University Museums Group UK and the Association of Art Historians.
