= Enterprise High School (Utah) =

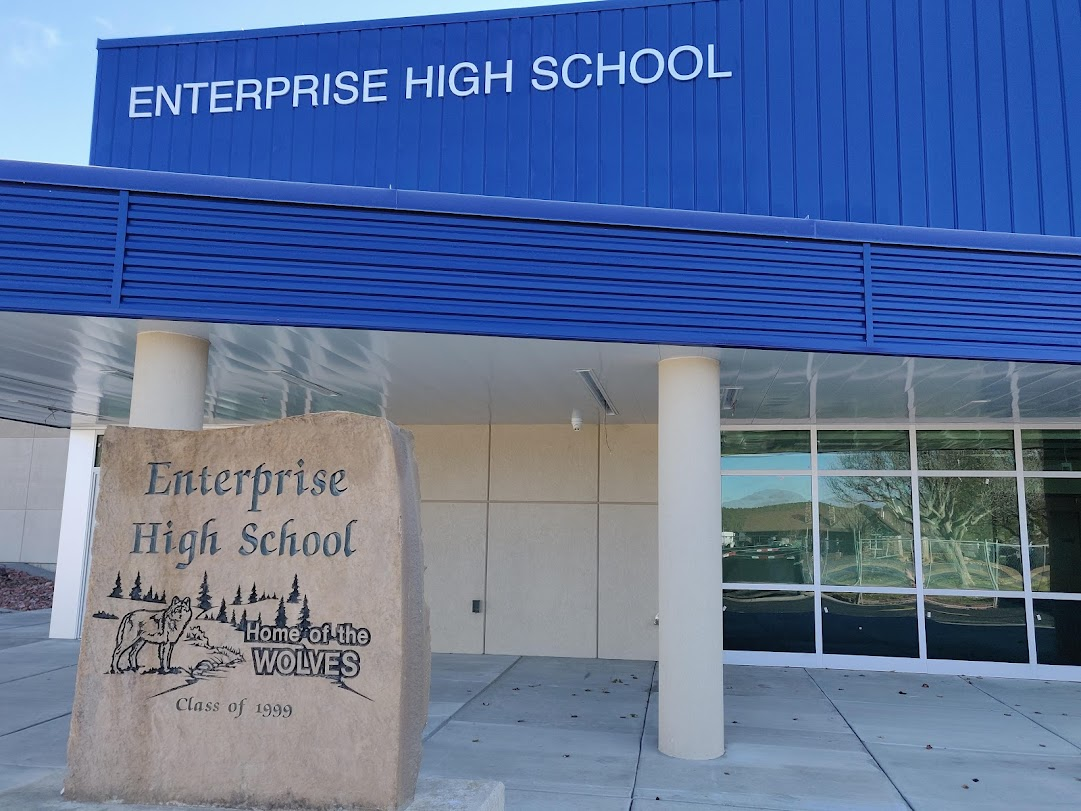

Location
- 565 South 200 East; Enterprise, Utah 84725; United States; 37°33′50.79″N 113°43′0.57″W

Information
- Type: Public high school six-year
- Motto: “Cultivating a Passion for Learning; Empowering and Motivating for Success”
- Established: 1922
- School district: Washington County School District
- Principal: Calvin Holt
- Teaching staff: 28.58 (FTE)
- Grades: 7-12
- Enrollment: 558 (2023-2024)
- Student to teacher ratio: 19.52
- Campus type: Rural
- Colors: Navy Blue & Yellow
- Song: Dear Enterprise High
- Mascot: Wolf
- Teams: Wolves
- Accreditation: Cognia (education) formerly AdvancEd
- Feeder schools: Enterprise Elementary School
- Website: ehs.washk12.org

Enterprise High School (EHS) is located in Enterprise, Utah, in the southwest part of the state, United States, and is the only 2A public high school in Washington County School District. Enterprise High School's nickname and mascot is the Wolves; the student section is referred to as the Wolf Pack.

Enterprise was established in 1896. It was settled by members of the Church of Jesus Christ of Latter-Day Saints who were called to settle the area by church leaders. Shortly thereafter, in 1898, a board of trustees was elected to oversee the needs of the 58 children in the community. The first classes were held in a one-room brick home. When the Young Men's Mutual Hall was completed one year later, the school moved into that building. As the community grew, more space was needed and classes were held at various locations and homes in the community. By 1917, the steadily increasing population had created a need for a more permanent school building. Construction began in 1921 on a new nine-room school building, which was completed in January 1922. Until 1922, only grades one through eight were held. With the construction of the new building, grades nine and ten were added. Students in eleventh and twelfth grades who wished to complete their education traveled north to Parowan. The latter two grades were added in 1927. For many years thereafter, grades one through 12 were held in the same building. In 1986, a new building was erected a few blocks southeast of the old school to house grades seven through 12. Most of the old school was demolished and a new elementary school built in its place.

== Sports ==
EHS competes in the 2A division in region 18 with other southern Utah schools in Beaver, Iron, Kane, and Millard counties. Its Football team competes in 1A South, one of two divisions for football that also includes Sevier county. Enterprise will remain in 2A Region 18 (and 1A South) for the 2023-2025 classification period. Enterprise High School's sports teams are known as the "Enterprise Wolves" and are a part of the Utah High School Activities Association Enterprise High School has won a total of 48 State Championships in 11 different sports.

=== Baseball ===
Enterprise has won 11 state baseball championships in 1984, 1985, 1986, 1987, 1988, 1992, 1993, 1994, 1996, 2011, and 2016.

=== Basketball ===
Enterprise has won 7 state basketball championships in 1986, 1987, 1988, 1994, 2014, 2021, and 2024.

=== Cross Country ===
Enterprise has won 4 state cross country championships in 1971, 1975, 1986, and 2009.

=== Debate/Forensics ===
Enterprise has won 1 state debate/forensics championship in 1995.

=== Drama ===
Enterprise has won 3 state drama championships in 1979, 1982, and 1993.

=== Drill Team ===
Enterprise has won 1 state drill team championship in 2021.

=== Football ===
Enterprise has won 1 state football championship in 2003.

=== Girls Basketball ===
Enterprise has won 7 state girls basketball championships in 1990, 1992, 1995, 1996, 1999, 2011, and 2014.

=== Softball ===
Enterprise has won 5 state softball championships in 2019, (2020 - COVID-19 year), 2021, 2023, 2024, and 2026.

=== Volleyball ===
Enterprise has won 6 state volleyball championships in 1989, 1990, 1991, 2013, 2014, and 2019.

=== All-Sports Award ===
Enterprise has won 2 all-sports awards in 1993-1994 and 1994–1995.

== Newspaper ==
When Enterprise High School's newspaper first came out in the early days of the school, it was called The Breeze. However, after some years, the name was refreshed to The Paw Print. It is a monthly printed publication, and the staff generally consists of two editors and various staff writers.

== School Fight Song ==
There is an emblem shining on the hillside for me, it reflects the meaning of love and purity; Love for school and schoolmates, love for teachers too; Oh, may we e‘er bring honor, our dear old school to you; Our dear old EHS, we’ll always love you best; Where’er we roam, near or far from home; You’ll be the dearest school in all the West, rah, rah, rah!; Our colors gold and blue, will be waiting for me and for you; While we live and learn, we’ll be longing to return to our EHS!

== Demographics ==
Enterprise High School is considered by the NCES to be Rural, Remote 43 which is Census-defined rural territory that is more than 25 miles from an urbanized area and is also more than 10 miles from an urban cluster. NCES reports that 32.5% of students at EHS are considered free lunch eligible, and 15% reduced-price lunch eligible.

Enterprise High School race/ethnicity (2018-19)
1. American Indian/ Alaska Native (0.20%)
2. Asian (0.50%)
3. Black (0.50%)
4. Hispanic (13.4%)
5. Native Hawaiian/ Pacific Islander (0.50%)
6. White (84.4%)
7. Two or more Races (0.50%)
NCES
Enterprise High School Gender (2018-19)
1. Female (44.5%)
2. Male (55.5%)
NCES

== Gallery ==
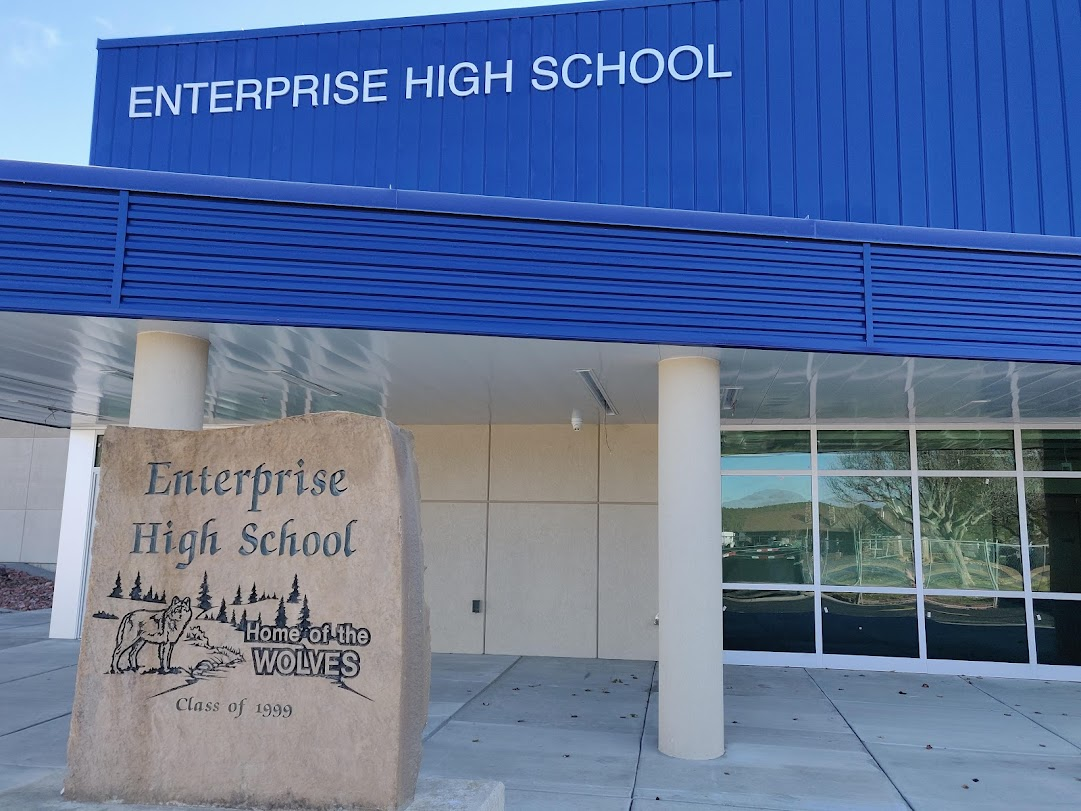
Front of Enterprise High School

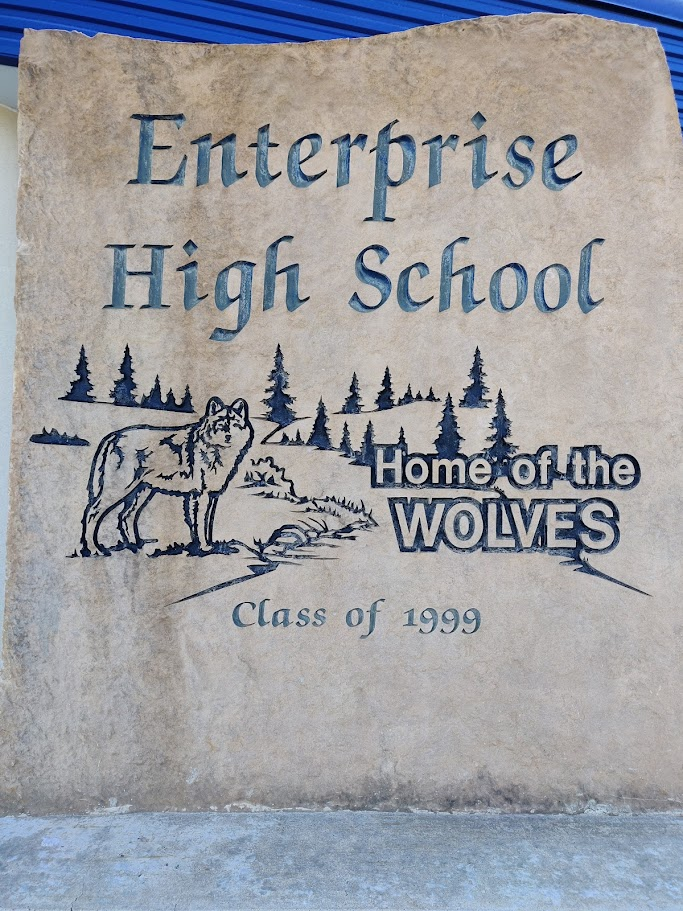
Home of the Wolves

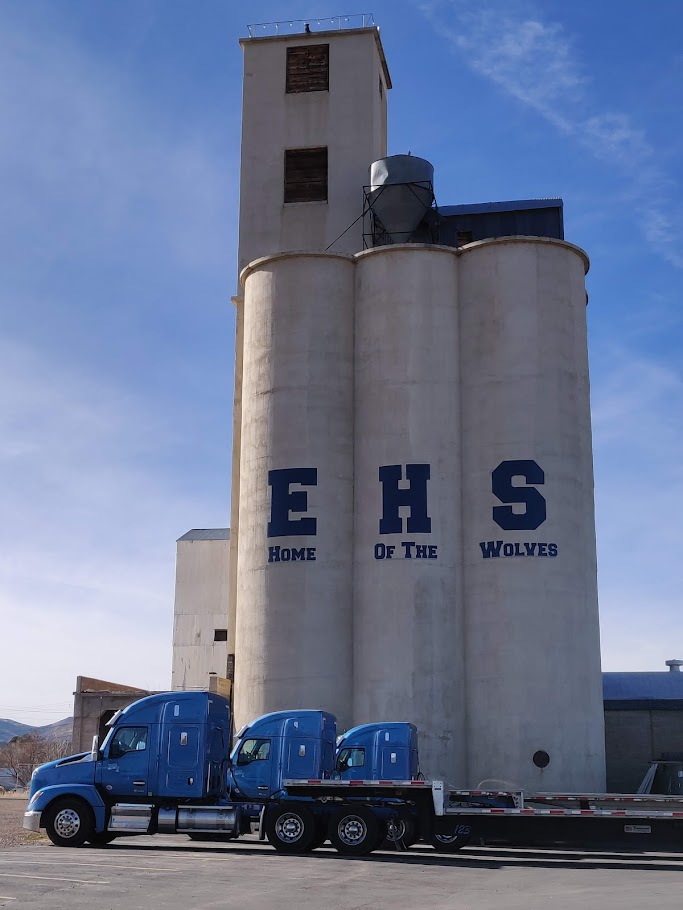
EHS on Grain Towers

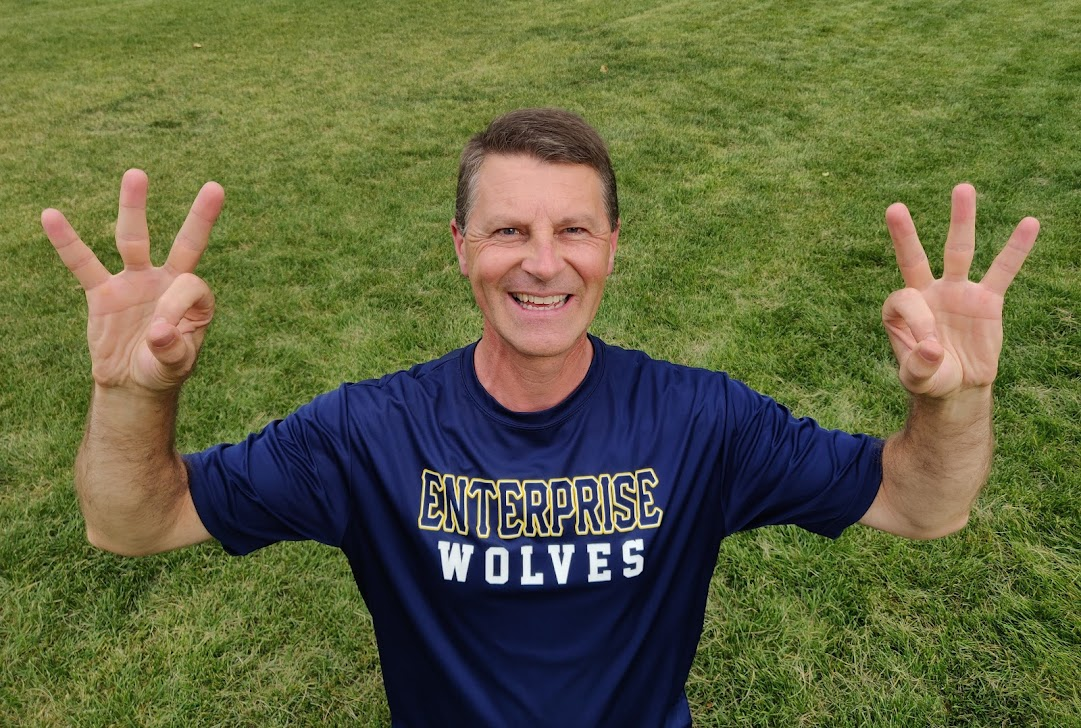
"W" is for Wolves

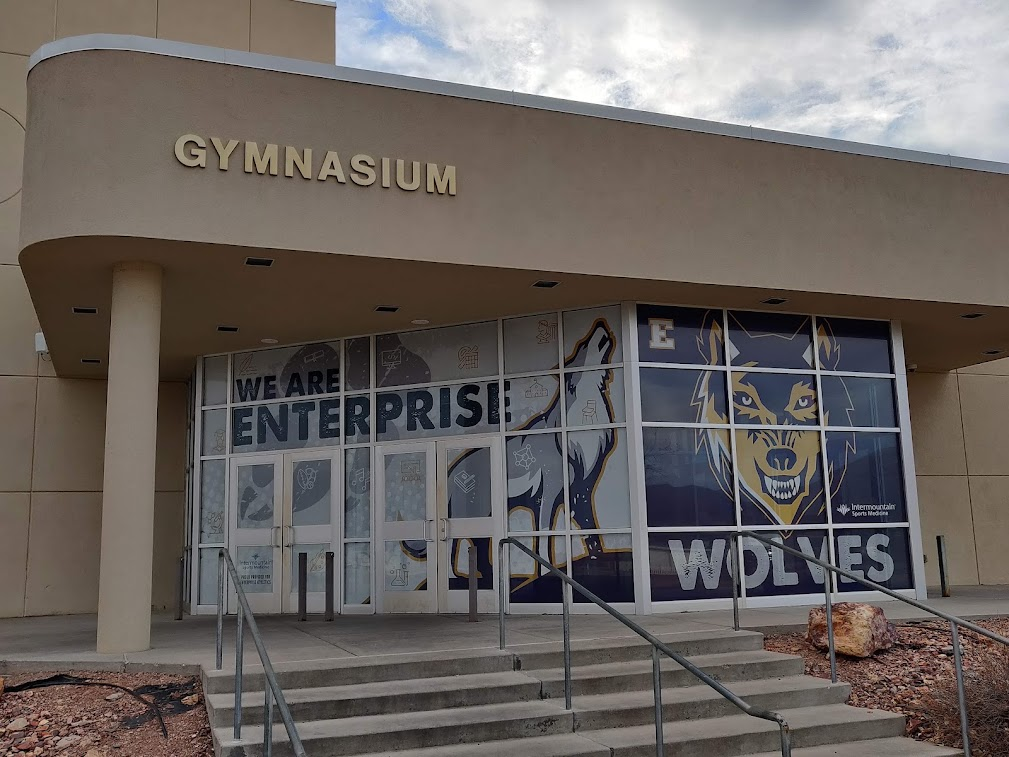
EHS Gymnasium Entrance

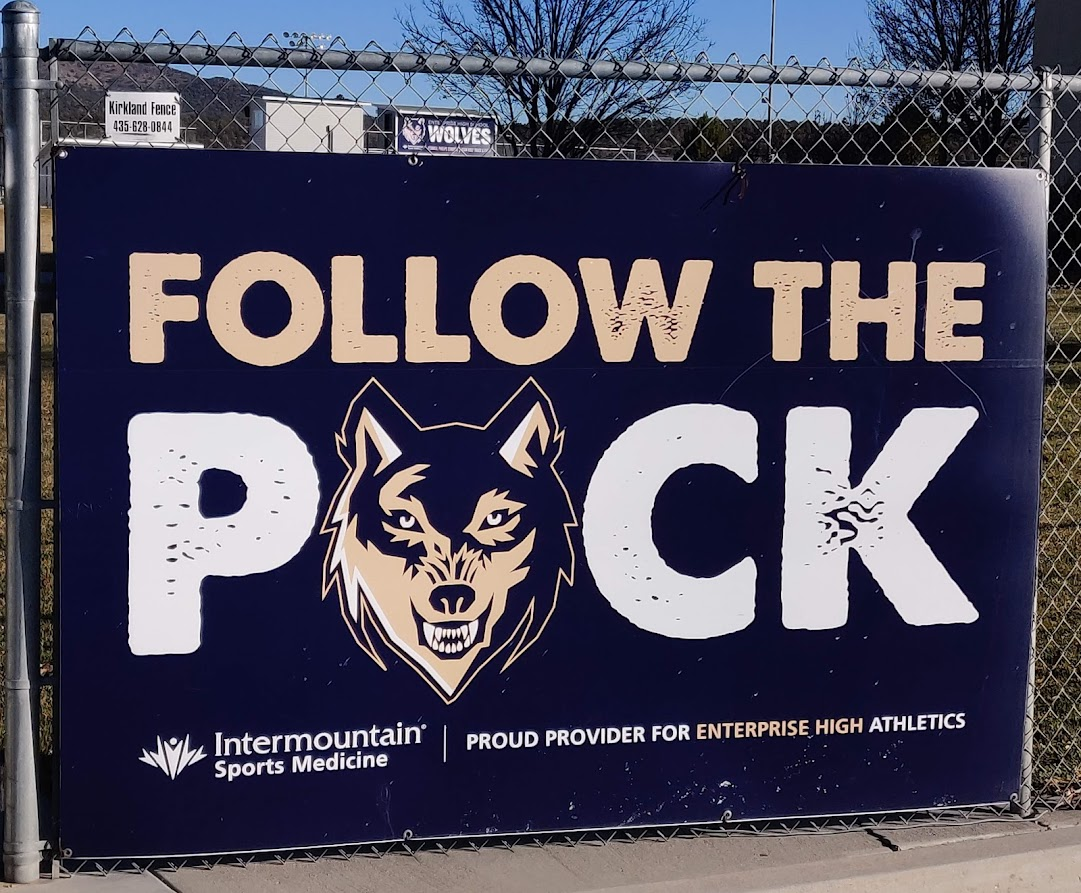
Follow The Pack

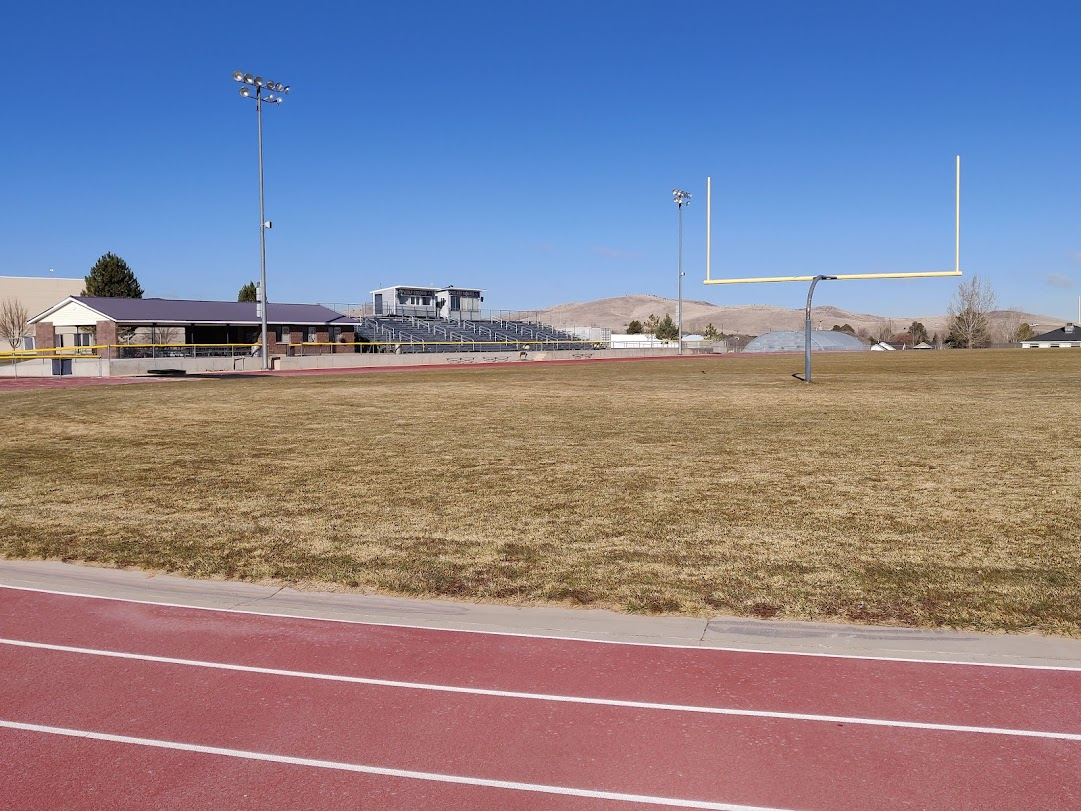
Football Field

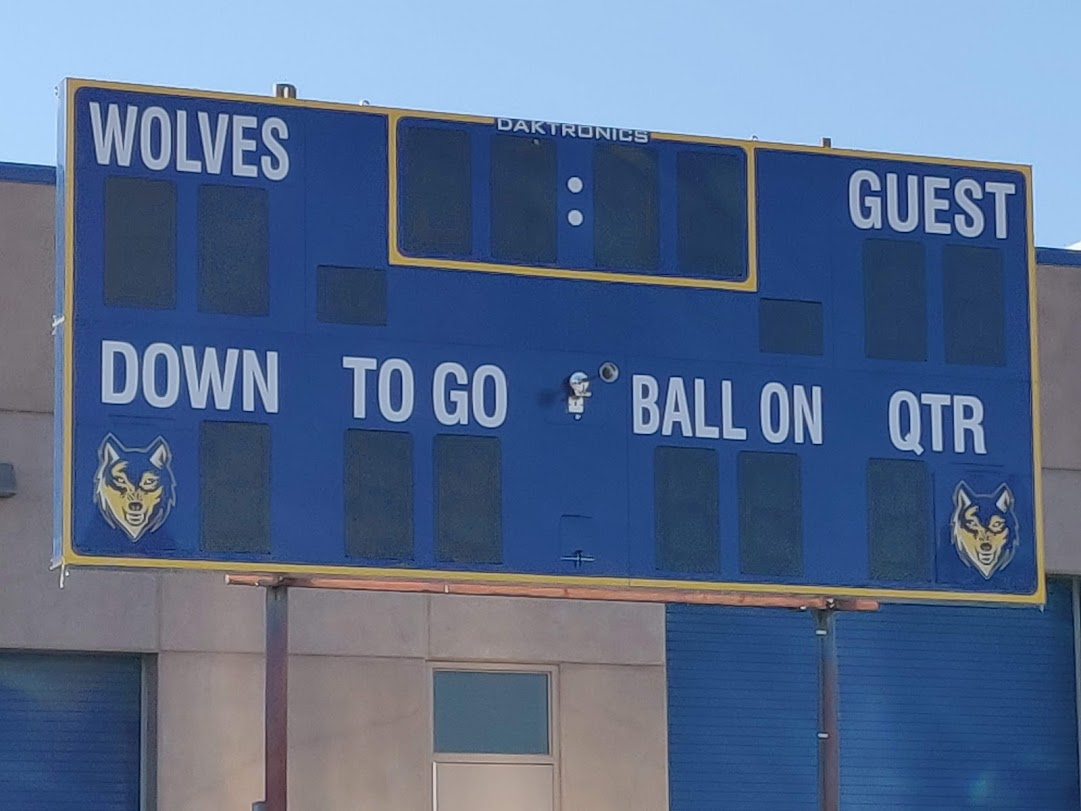
Football Scoreboard

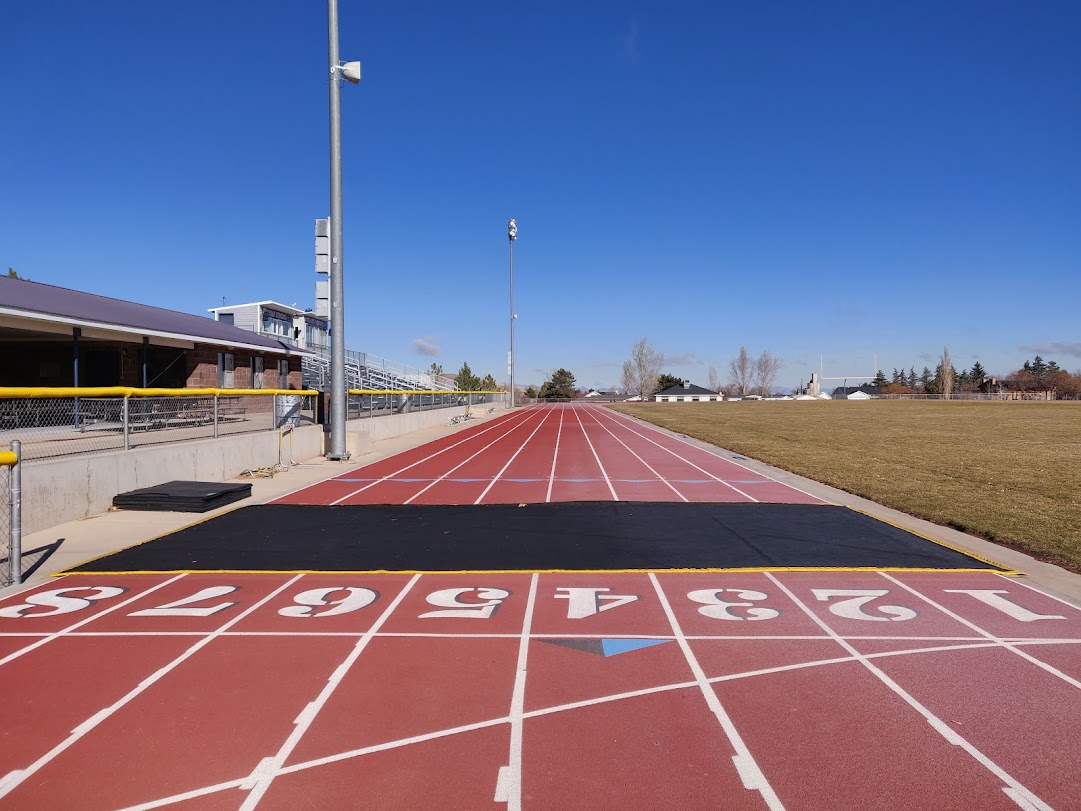
Enterprise High Track

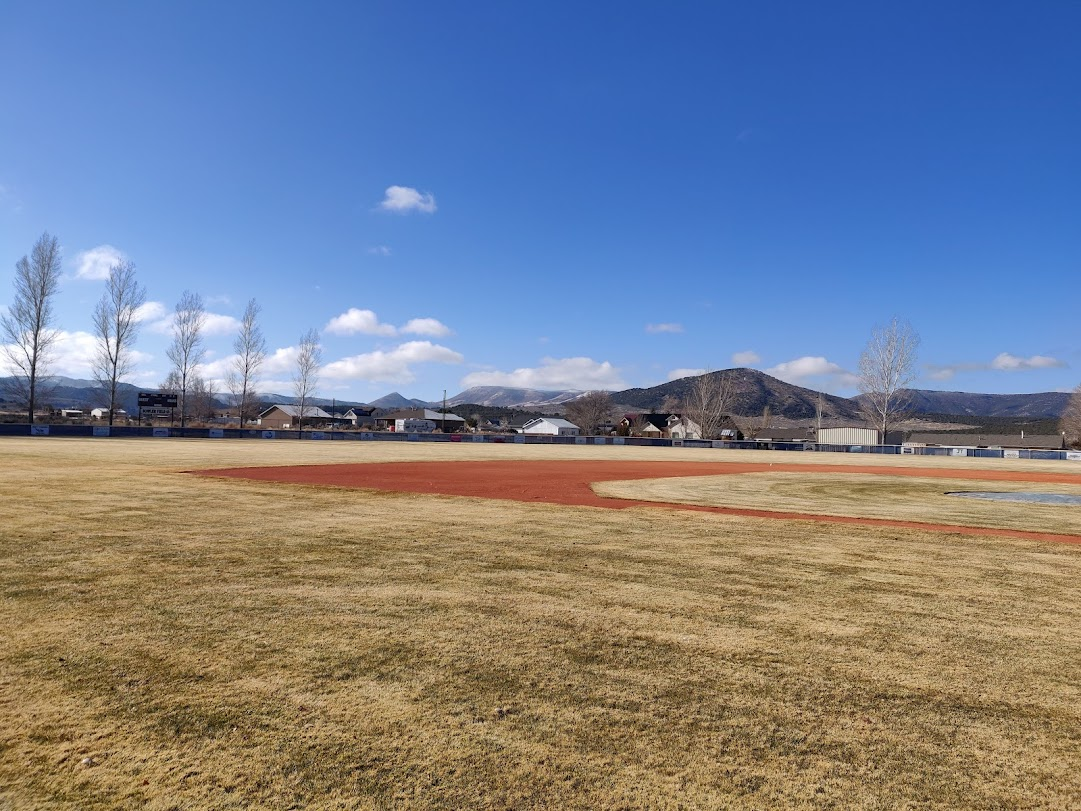
EHS Baseball Field

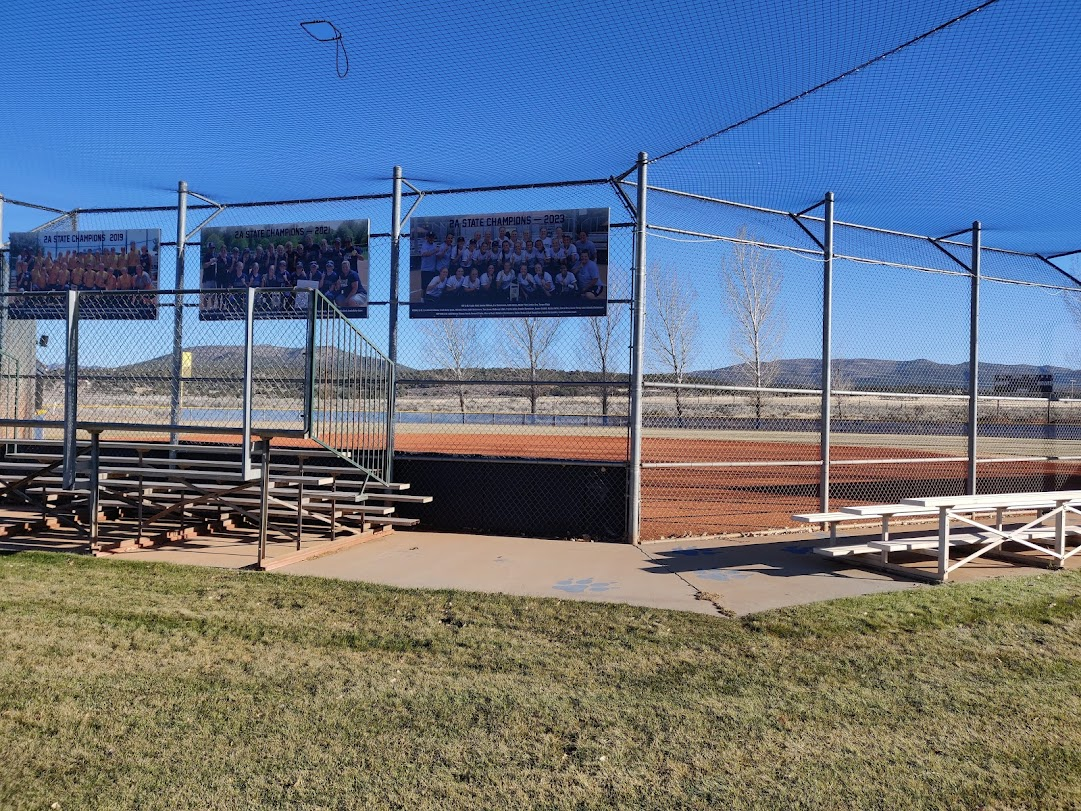
EHS Softball Field
