= Utah State Route 9 =

State highway in Washington and Kane counties in Utah, United States

State Route 9
- Zion Park Scenic Byway
- SR-9 highlighted in red

Route information
- Maintained by UDOT
- Length: 57.075 mi (91.853 km)
- Existed: 1920s as SR-15; renumbered in 1977–present

Major junctions
- West end: I-15 in Washington
- SR-17 in La Verkin
- East end: US 89 at Mt. Carmel Junction

Location
- Country: United States
- State: Utah
- Counties: Washington, Kane

Highway system
- Utah State Highway System; Interstate; US; State; Minor; Scenic
← SR-8	→ SR-10

State Route 9 (SR-9) is a 57.075-mile-long (91.853 km) state highway in southern Utah, serving Zion National Park. It starts at the western terminus at exit 16 on Interstate 15 (I-15), passing through Zion National Park, and ending at the eastern junction with U.S. Route 89 (US-89). The entire length of the highway has been designated the Zion Park Scenic Byway. There is a fee to travel through Zion National Park, but the Zion-Mt. Carmel Highway is open to private vehicles year-round. A separate fee is required for vehicles 7'10" wide and/or 11'4" tall or larger. This fee pays for a park employee to stop traffic from the other side of the Zion - Mt. Carmel Tunnel to allow the larger vehicles to pass through. There is a smaller tunnel in Zion National Park that does not require an escort. Commercial vehicles are prohibited from using SR-9 and are directed to use SR-20 instead.

The entire route, including the connection through Zion National Park, has been listed as part of the National Highway System.

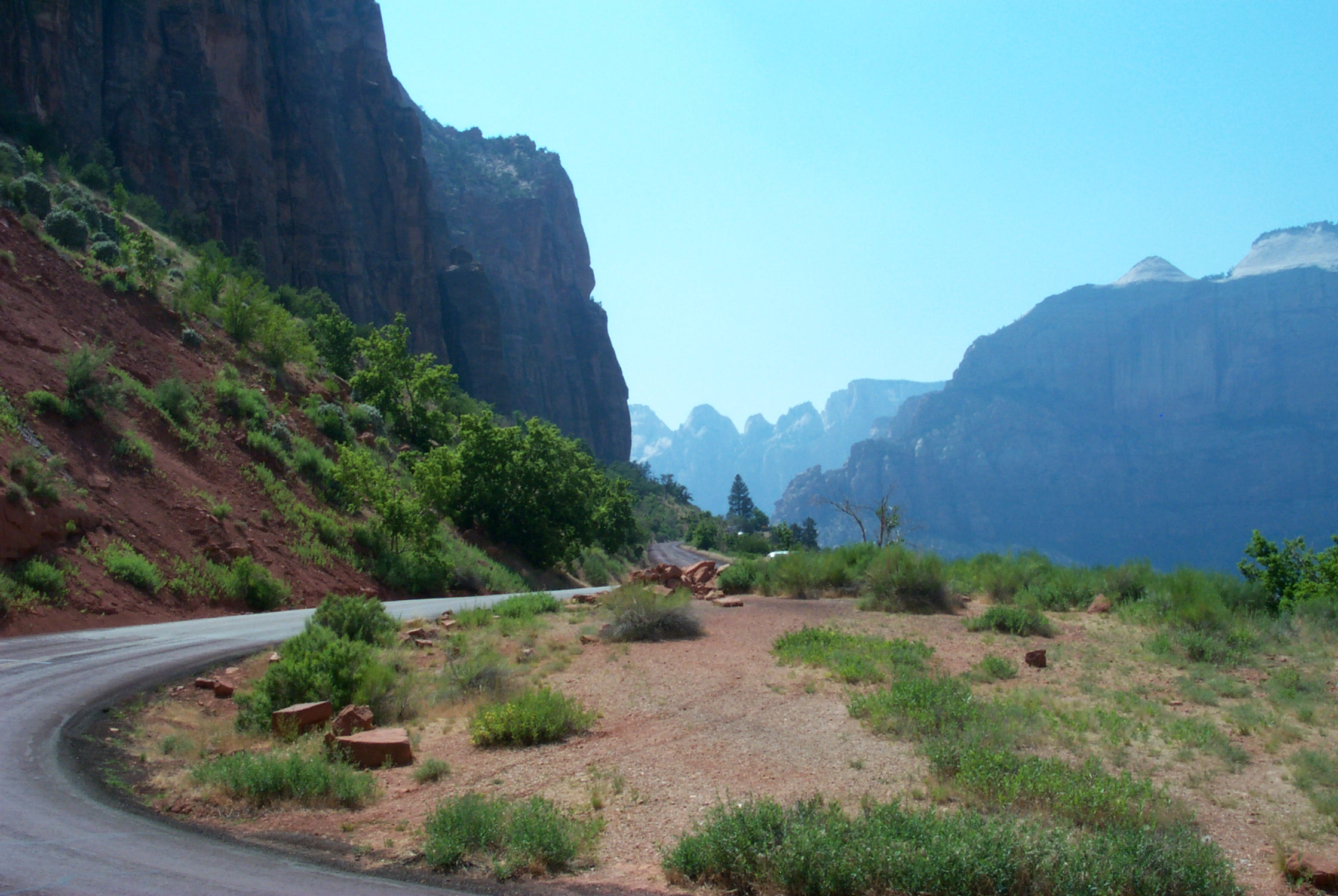
The Zion-Mount Carmel Highway.

== Route description ==
=== Harrisburg Junction to Zion National Park ===
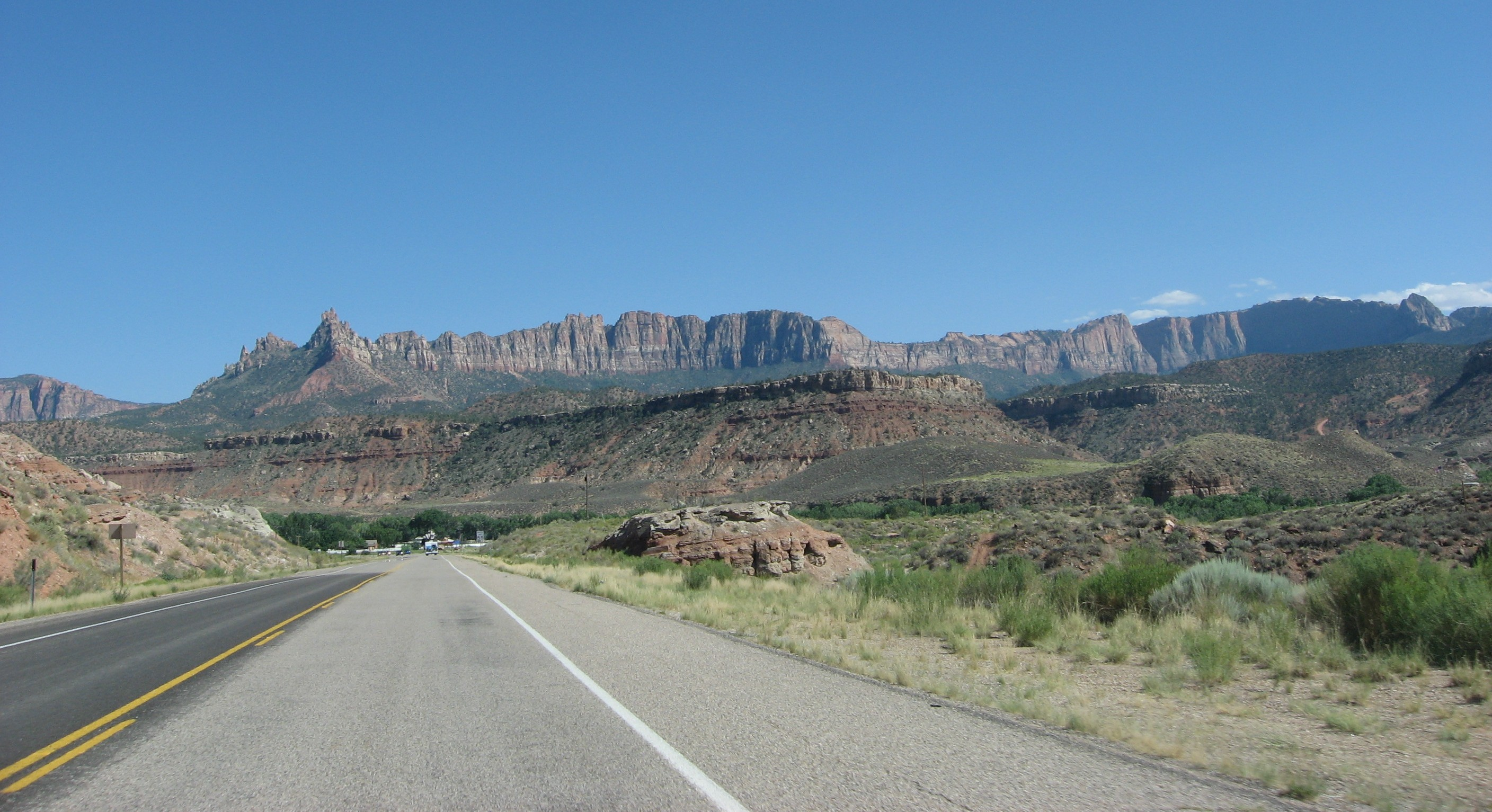
Scenic SR-9 on the west side of Zion National Park

SR-9 begins at I-15, Exit 16, at Harrisburg Junction, just north of Washington. Immediately upon exiting I-15, SR-9 enters the Coral Canyon Development, which features an 18-hole golf course. Coral Canyon is split by the city boundaries of Hurricane and Washington. Upon leaving this development, SR-9 passes through two ridges and begins its descent into the aptly named Purgatory Flats, home of the County Fairgrounds and a penitentiary. The 'flats' are a relatively level area between two sharply defined ridges. Quail Creek State Park lies about a mile to the north of the road between these two ridges. Upon passing through the second ridge, SR-9 crosses the Virgin River and climbs a small plateau to the region of Hurricane known as Brentwood. The road descends from this plateau into downtown Hurricane, where SR-59 splits to the south toward the Arizona border. SR-9 then swings north towards the town of La Verkin, crossing an old bridge over the La Verkin River Ravine, before entering that town. In La Verkin, SR-17 takes off to the north, where it meets back up with I-15. After leaving La Verkin, SR-9 heads uphill and passes several mesas before eventually going through the small towns of Virgin, Rockville, and Springdale.

=== Zion National Park to Mount Carmel Junction, Utah ===
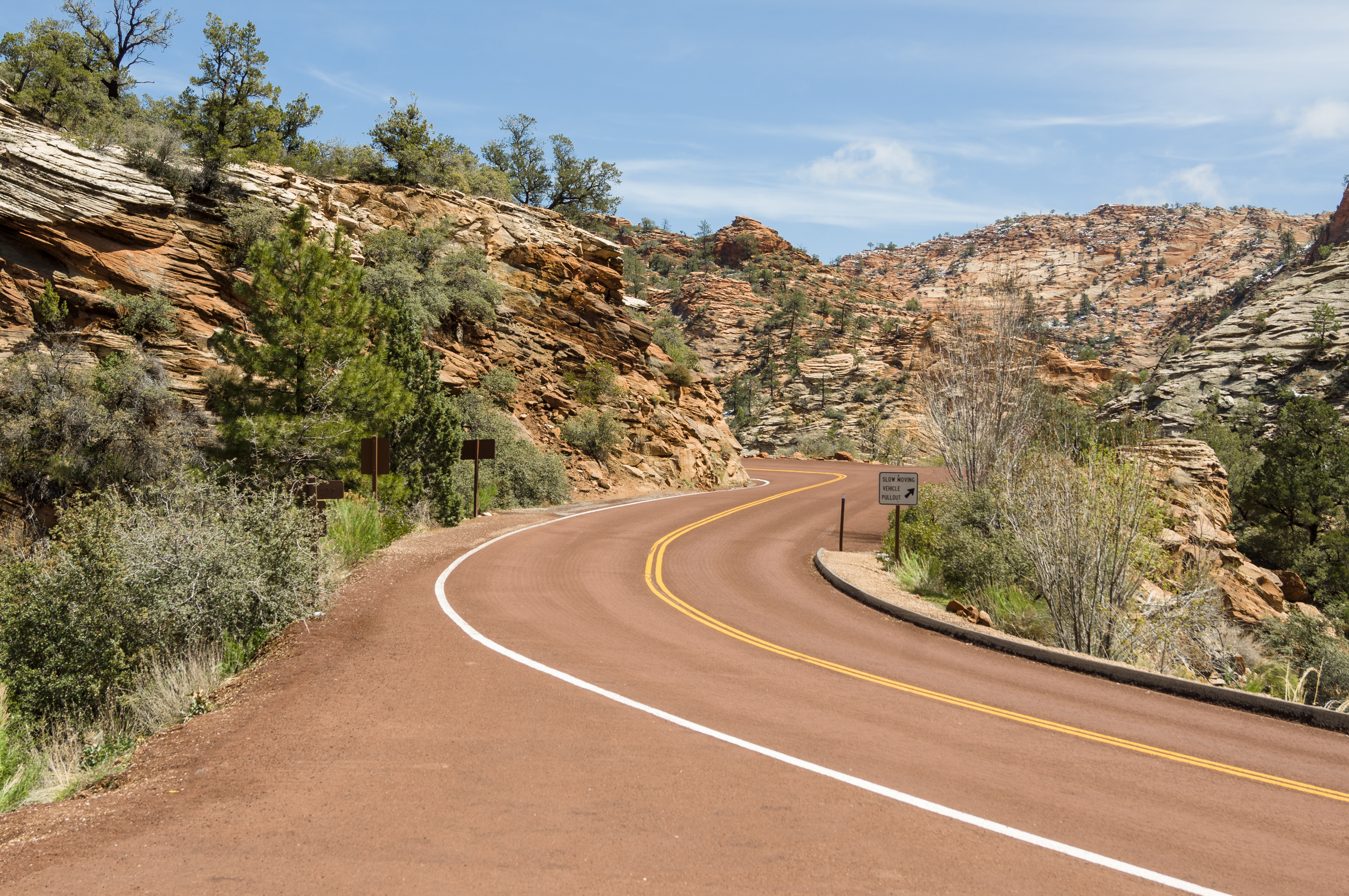
State Route 9 near Canyon Overlook trailhead

This scenic section of SR-9 twists and turns along 14 miles (23 km) through Zion National Park and then another 12 miles to Mount Carmel Junction. This section of the road is called the Zion-Mount Carmel Highway and the section through the park is effectively a toll road requiring park access fees. The highway begins on the south side of Zion National Park following along the North Fork of the Virgin River. The road then turns at the junction of Pine Creek and the North Fork of the Virgin River and continues up Pine Creek Canyon, up the switchbacks and into the Zion-Mt. Carmel Tunnel. On the east side of the tunnel the highway continues through impressive scenery, past the Canyon Overlook Trailhead, the East Rim Trailhead and the unique Zion landmark, Checkerboard Mesa. Finally the road exits the park through the east entrance and 12 miles (19 km) later ends at the junction of SR-9 and US-89 in Mount Carmel Junction.

== History ==
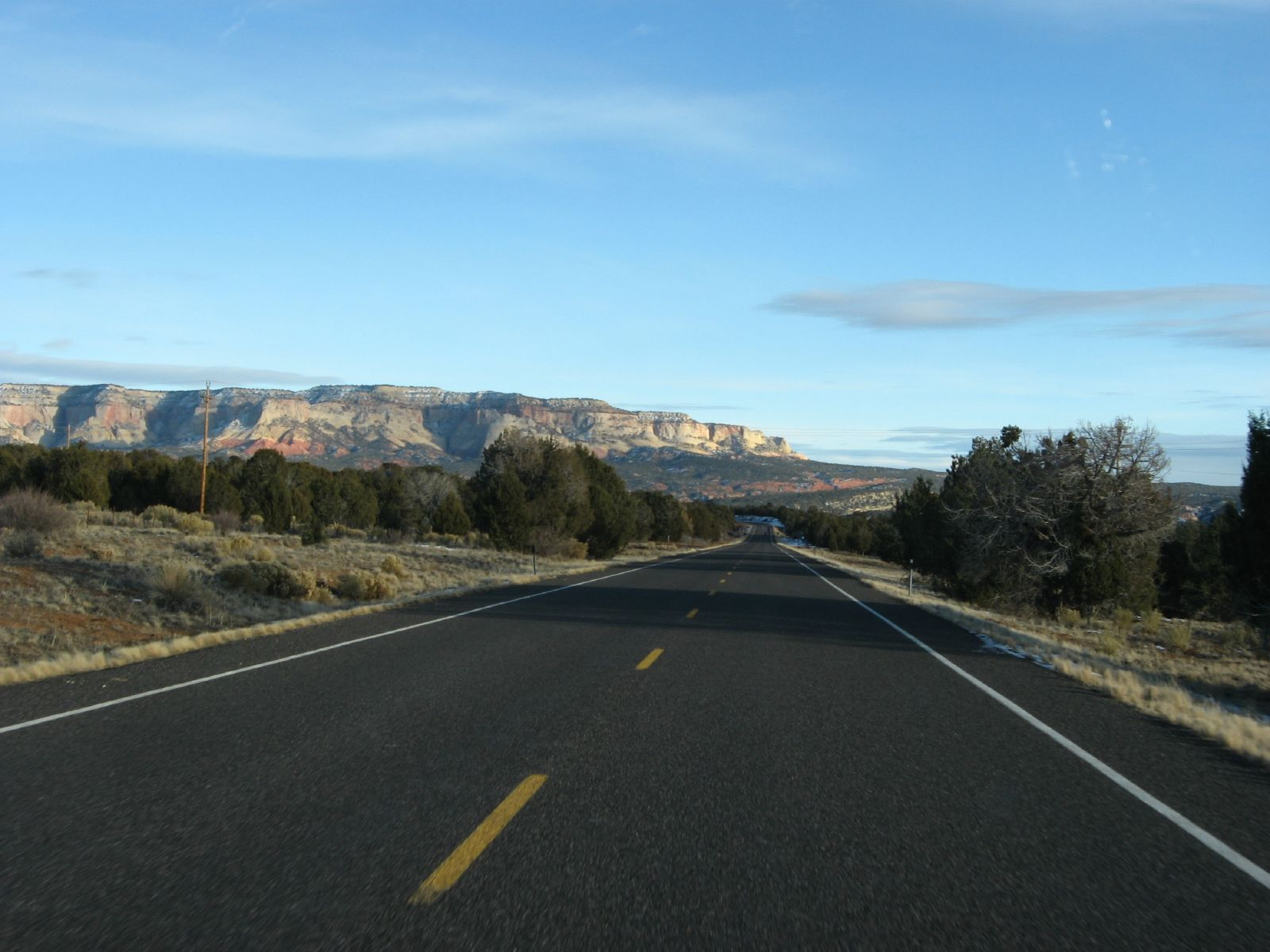
SR-9 between Zion National Park and Mount Carmel

State Route 9 was numbered State Route 15 prior to 1977.

The road from Hurricane north through La Verkin to US-91 at Anderson Junction was added to the state highway system in 1912, and a branch was added from La Verkin Junction east to Zion National Park in 1916 and beyond to Mt. Carmel Junction in 1923.

In the 1920s, the State Road Commission assigned State Route 15 to the road from Anderson Junction to the park, while State Route 16 included the branch to Hurricane (and continued southeast to Arizona via present SR-59). In 1927, the state legislature extended SR-15 through the park to Mt. Carmel Junction, and added a new State Route 17, which formed a cutoff from US-91 at Harrisburg Junction east to Hurricane.

SR-17 also included SR-16 from Hurricane north to La Verkin Junction and southeast to Big Plain Junction, where the realigned SR-16 turned north to SR-15 at Rockville. The portion of SR-17 from Hurricane to Big Plain Junction was split off as SR-59 in 1931, leaving SR-15 and SR-17 as a loop off US-91 through Hurricane and La Verkin, with SR-15 continuing east through Zion National Park.

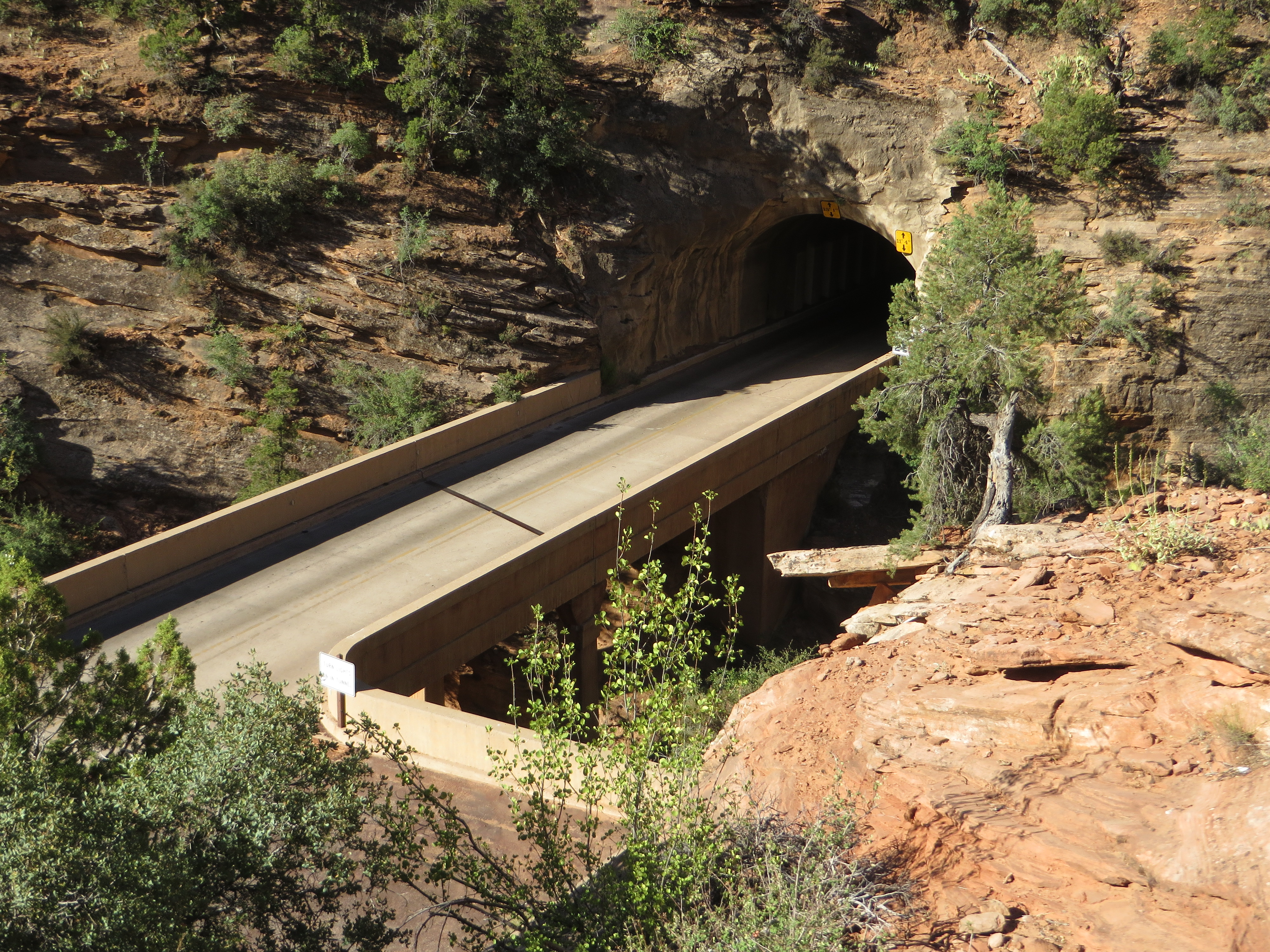
SR-9 at the east end of the tunnel

Construction began through and east of the national park in 1927, on the portion that had been added to the state highway system in 1923 and to SR-15 in 1927. The Nevada Construction Company completed the Zion-Mt. Carmel Tunnel in 1930, after three years of construction and a cost of $1,896,000. SR-15 and SR-17 were swapped in 1969, giving SR-15 the route from Harrisburg Junction and SR-17 its present route. In the 1977 renumbering, SR-15 was renumbered SR-9 due to the existence of Interstate 15.

The 1992 St. George earthquake destroyed three houses as well as above- and below-ground utilities, causing about $1 million in damage. In the Balanced Rock Hills area of Springdale, a landslide covered part of SR-9, taking several hours to complete movement. The slide was about 1,600 feet (490 m) long and 3,600 feet (1,100 m) wide, contained boulders up to 20 feet (6.1 m) in diameter, with a total volume of 18,000,000 cubic yards (14,000,000 m^{3}) and total area of 4,400,400 square feet (408,810 m^{2}).

== Major intersections ==
County	Location	mi	km	Destinations	Notes
Washington	Washington–Hurricane line	0.000	0.000	I-15 – Las Vegas, Cedar City, Salt Lake	Western terminus; exit 16 on I-15; trumpet interchange
Washington	Washington–Hurricane line	0.512	0.824	Coral Canyon Boulevard	Interchange
Washington	Hurricane	1.107	1.782	Telegraph Street	Former US-91
Washington	Hurricane	2.766	4.451	SR-318 north – Quail Creek State Park	Southern terminus of SR-318
Washington	Hurricane			SR-7 west (Southern Parkway)	Interchange
Washington	Hurricane	9.776	15.733	SR-59 east (Main Street) – Grand Canyon	Western terminus of SR-59
Washington	La Verkin	12.458	20.049	SR-17 north (State Street) – Toquerville	Southern terminus of SR-17
Washington	Rockville	28.102	45.226	Bridge Road (Rockville Bridge)	Former SR-16
Washington	Zion National Park	34.2	55.0	Floor of the Valley Road	
Kane	Mt. Carmel Junction	57.075	91.853	US 89 – Kanab, Mt. Carmel, Panguitch	Eastern terminus
1.000 mi = 1.609 km; 1.000 km = 0.621 mi
