= Utah State Route 16 (disambiguation) =

State Route 16

Location
- Country: United States
- State: Utah

Highway system
- Utah State Highway System; Interstate; US; State; Minor; Scenic
← SR-15	→ SR-17

Utah State Route 16 may refer to:

- Utah State Route 16, a state highway in Rich County in northern Utah, United States
- Utah State Route 16 (1962-1977), a former state highway in Rich County, Utah, United States
- Utah State Route 16 (1935-1955), a former state highway in northwestern Washington County and southwestern Iron County in southwestern Utah, United States
- Utah State Route 16 (1920s–1935), a former state highway in southeastern Washington County, Utah, United States

== See also ==
- List of state highways in Utah
- List of highways numbered 16
