= Arizona State Route 389 =

State highway in Arizona, United States

State Route 389

Route information
- Maintained by ADOT
- Length: 32.60 mi (52.46 km)
- Existed: 1959–present

Major junctions
- West end: SR-59 in Colorado City
- East end: US 89A in Fredonia

Location
- Country: United States
- State: Arizona

Highway system
- Arizona State Highway System; Interstate; US; State; Scenic Proposed; Former
| ← SR 387 | → Loop 404 |

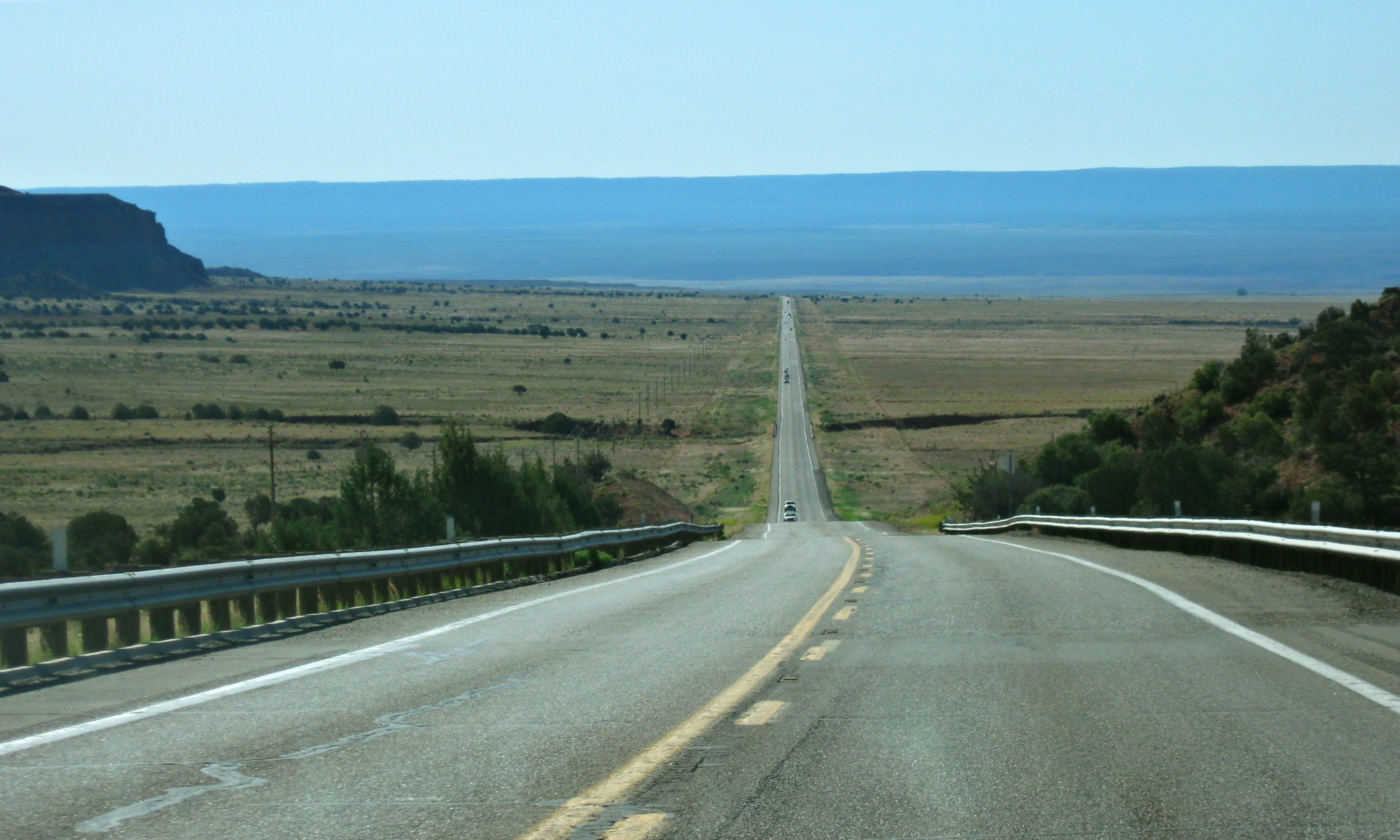
State Route 389 in Mohave County

State Route 389, also known as SR 389, is a state highway in far northern Arizona serving the Arizona Strip. SR 389 stretches from the Utah border at Colorado City, southeast to Pipe Spring National Monument, and ends at U.S. Route 89A in Fredonia; it is the only major east–west route between these two towns, and also serves to connect Fredonia with points farther west such as St. George, Utah.

== Route description ==
SR 389 is a 32.60-mile (52.46 km) highway located in the Arizona Strip that connects the two cities of Colorado City and Fredonia. The western terminus of the highway is located at the Utah border in Colorado City where the highway continues into Utah as State Route 59. SR 389 heads southeast from the border intersecting several county routes along its routing. The highway takes a more easterly course as it enters the Kaibab Indian Reservation. Within the reservation, the highway passes near the Pipe Spring National Monument. Once it passes the monument, the highway begins to head towards the northeast towards Fredonia. It leaves the Kaibab Indian Reservation and enters the city of Fredonia before reaching its eastern terminus at US 89A.

== History ==
SR 389 was established in 1959 along its current route.

== Junction list ==
| County | Location | mi | km | Destinations | Notes |
|---|---|---|---|---|---|
| Mohave | | 0.00 | 0.00 | SR-59 west / Uzona Avenue – Hurricane | Continuation into Hildale, Utah |
| Coconino | Fredonia | 32.58 | 52.43 | US 89A – Kanab, Lake Powell, Jacob Lake, Grand Canyon | Eastern terminus; road continues as Pratt Street |
1.000 mi = 1.609 km; 1.000 km = 0.621 mi
