= Utah State Route 168 =

Highway in Riverdale, Utah

State Route 168
- SR-168 highlighted in red

Route information
- Maintained by UDOT
- Length: 1.160 mi (1.867 km)
- Existed: 1962–present

Major junctions
- South end: North gate of Hill Air Force Base
- North end: SR-60 in Riverdale

Location
- Country: United States
- State: Utah
- Counties: Weber

Highway system
- Utah State Highway System; Interstate; US; State; Minor; Scenic
← SR-167	→ SR-171

State Route 168 is a state highway in the state of Utah that spans 1.160 miles (1.867 km) from Riverdale, Utah to Hill Air Force Base in Weber County.

== Route description ==
This route is essentially a short access road to the former north gate at Hill Air Force Base. The southern terminus of this route is at the now-closed north gate of Hill Air Force Base. From there it travels downhill and northwest before turning northeast and ending at SR-60 (Riverdale Road).

== History ==
On November 13, 1961, the Utah State Road Commission added the road from SR-60 to the north entrance of Hill Air Force Base entrance to the state highway system, and the state legislature approved it the next year. Although the north entrance has since been closed, the route has remained essentially unchanged.

== Major intersections ==
The entire route is in Weber County.

Location	mi	km	Destinations	Notes
Hill Air Force Base	0.000	0.000	North gate	Southern terminus
Riverdale	1.116	1.796	SR-60 (South Weber Drive)	Northern terminus
1.000 mi = 1.609 km; 1.000 km = 0.621 mi
