= Hurricane Fault =

Geologic formation in Arizona and Utah, United States

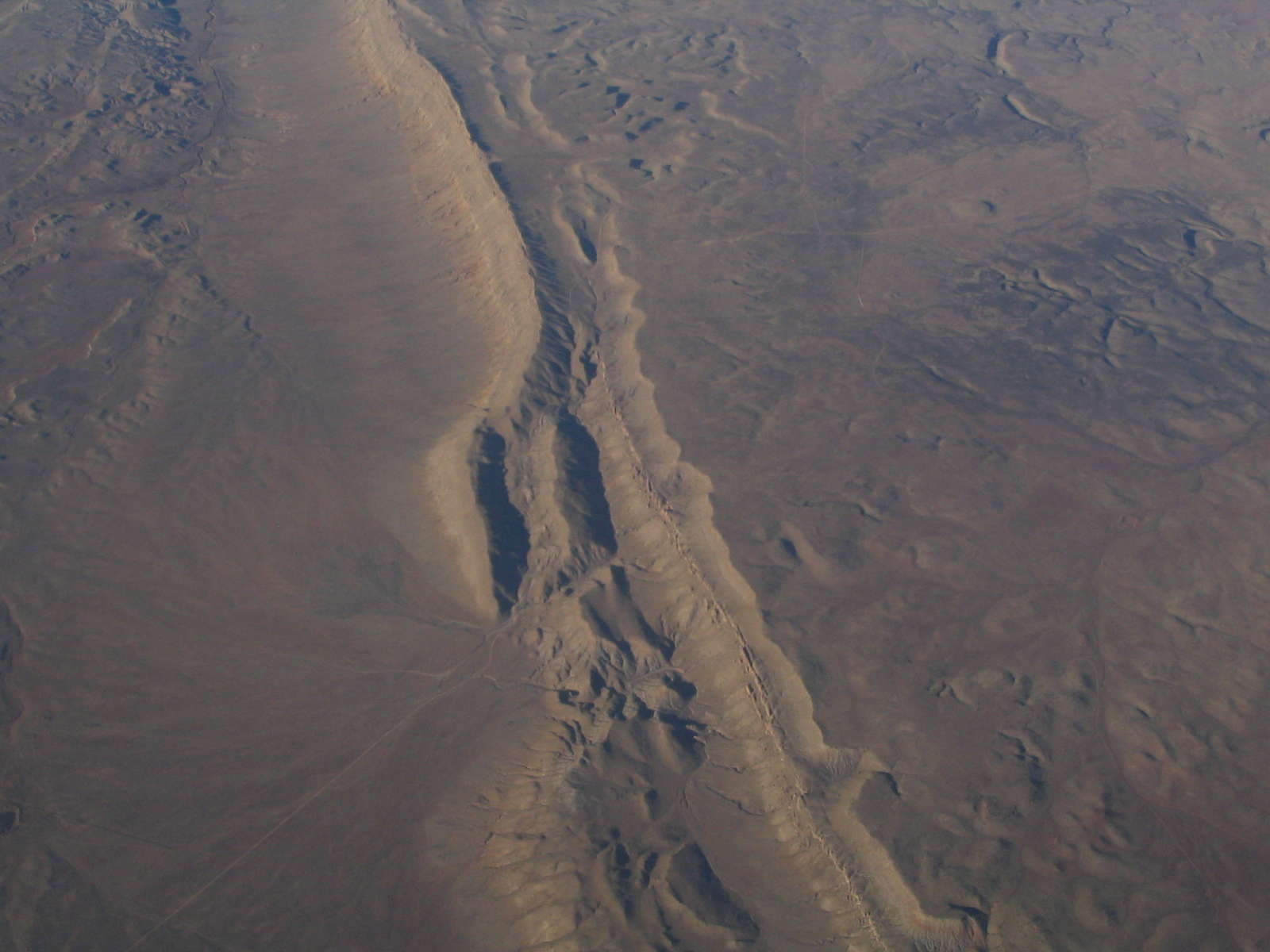
- The Hurricane Cliffs, formed by the Hurricane Fault, near St. George, Utah viewed from above.
- Etymology: Hurricane, Utah
- Country: United States
- State: Arizona, Utah
- Cities: St. George, Utah area

Characteristics
- Part of: Colorado Plateau, Basin and Range Province
- Length: 250 km (160 mi)

Tectonics
- Plate: North American
- Status: Active
- Earthquakes: 1992 and others
- Type: Normal fault
- Movement: 0.15 to 0.25 mm/yr

The Hurricane Fault is an intracrustal seismic fault that runs along the boundary between the Colorado Plateau block and the Basin and Range geologic province of western North America. It is a 250-km-long, north–south striking, high-angle, down-to-the-west normal fault, running from about Cedar City, Utah southward into northwestern Arizona. The fault is named for the community of Hurricane.

The 1992 St. George earthquake (magnitude 5.8), which triggered a damaging landslide, has been attributed to the Hurricane Fault.
