= Southern Parkway =

Southern Parkway may refer to:

- Southern Parkway (Queens), part of the Belt System
- Southern Parkway (Louisville, Kentucky)
- Utah State Route 7, a highway in southern Utah named Southern Parkway

== See also ==
- Southern State Parkway on Long Island
