= Utah State Route 60 =

State highway in Utah, United States

State Route 60
- SR-60 highlighted in red

Route information
- Maintained by UDOT
- Length: 7.496 mi (12.064 km)
- Existed: 1912 as a state highway; 1935 as SR-60–present

Major junctions
- West end: SR-26 in Riverdale
- East end: US 89 in South Weber

Location
- Country: United States
- State: Utah

Highway system
- Utah State Highway System; Interstate; US; State; Minor; Scenic
← SR-59	→ SR-61

State Route 60 (SR-60) is a 7.496-mile-long (12.064 km) state highway in the U.S. state of Utah, serving local traffic in the Ogden area. It parallels Interstate 84 (I-84) from SR-26 in Riverdale to U.S. Route 89 (US-89) in South Weber, and was part of the first state highway into Weber Canyon.

== Route description ==
The entire length of SR-60 is just south of the Weber River and north of the Davis-Weber Canal in the cities of Riverdale and South Weber. The highway begins at SR-26 (Riverdale Road) and heads south under I-84, turning southeast at the SR-168 intersection and slowly climbing towards the end at US-89. Cornia Drive - formerly SR-49A - continues straight at the east terminus, an interchange with US-89 near the mouth of the Weber Canyon. Traffic wanting to continue east through the canyon, leaving the Weber Valley to cross the Wasatch Range, heads north on US-89 to I-84.

== History ==
The road from SR-1 (US-91, now SR-26) at Riverdale Junction east into Weber Canyon became a state highway in 1912 and part of SR-5 and US-30S in the 1920s. It was also along the route of the transcontinental Lincoln Highway from September 1913 until April 1915, when the auto trail was moved to the more direct Parley's Canyon. In 1927, the state legislature defined a new route for SR-5 that began farther north on SR-1 in Ogden; the old alignment between SR-1 and the canyon was initially a branch of SR-49 (now US-89), but in 1935 it was split off as State Route 60. At the west end, a short realignment was built with federal aid as a national defense project in the early 1940s to improve access to the Ogden Ordnance Depot. The new road bypassed what is now 1150 West, and continued south from SR-60 to the depot along what is now SR-168. The east end was realigned in about 2000 when US-89 was reconstructed.

State Route 49A was designated in 1953 as an effective eastward continuation of SR-60, running northeast from US-89 (legislatively SR-49) near the east end of SR-60 along what is now Cornia Drive to US-30S at the mouth of Weber Canyon. However, this was soon bypassed when I-80N (now I-84) was built, and it was turned back to local jurisdiction in 1966.

== Major intersections ==
County	Location	mi	km	Destinations	Notes
Weber	Riverdale	0.000	0.000	SR-26 (Riverdale Road)	Western terminus
Weber	Riverdale	0.779	1.254	SR-168	
Davis	South Weber	3.741	6.021	475 East to Adams Avenue Parkway	
Davis	South Weber	7.496	12.064	US 89	Eastern terminus; interchange
1.000 mi = 1.609 km; 1.000 km = 0.621 mi
