= Second Chances in Southern Utah =

Former Utah girls' school

Location
- 591 North State; Laverkin, Washington County, Utah 84745; United States

Information
- School type: Private behavioral youth modification facility
- Religious affiliation: Christian (non-denominational)
- Opened: Oct 09, 2014
- Founder: Adam AhQuin
- Status: Closed
- Closed: 2022
- Grades: 8–12
- Gender: All-Girls

Second Chances in Southern Utah (SCINSU) was a private, all-girls behavioral youth modification facility and part of the troubled teen industry. The facility was located in La Verkin, Utah, the program ceased operations in 2022 for reasons that have not been publicly disclosed.

== History ==
Adam AhQuin, the founder and director of Second Chances in Southern Utah (SCINSU), previously served as a gymnastics coach and the principal of Mana Academy, a K–12 charter school. He was a co-founder and program director of the now-defunct Maximum Life Skills Academy, a behavioral modification center, whose license was revoked in 2004 after a 31-year-old aide was beaten to death by two 17-year-old residents. SINSU's registered start date is October 9, 2014.

Conflicting information exists about the program's closure date and reason for closure. Most sources indicate it closed in 2022, but at least one source suggests it may have closed in 2023.

== Program ==
According to the now-defunct website of Second Chances in Southern Utah, the program offered three treatment packages. The first package, called "Open Mind/Passion Interest Mapping/Add To Self Principles", lasted for three months. The second package, named "Hard Work & The Aloha Principles", extended for six months. The third package, "SCINSU Growing Principles! Positive Attitude/Integrity/Passion Interest Mapping Home & Beyond", was a comprehensive one-year program. Prior to closing, the last publicly available enrollment information listed a total of 20 students.

== Corrective Action Plan ==
Second Chances in Southern Utah was given a corrective action plan for multiple violations, as detailed by the Utah Department of Human Services' Office of Licensing in a letter dated September 10, 2019. The noted issues included a delayed report of a critical incident involving a staff member and five clients from May 5, 2019, which was not reported until August 26, 2019. Additionally, it was reported that during this incident, a staff member took five clients off-campus without proper authorization and provided at least four of them with a vape to smoke. Another violation noted was the inadequate staff-to-client ratio observed on September 4, 2019, which did not meet the required administrative standards. These infractions required the implementation of a formal corrective action plan to address and rectify the compliance failures.
