= Utah State Route 59 =

State highway in Washington County, Utah, United States

State Route 59
- State Route 59 highlighted in red

Route information
- Maintained by UDOT
- Length: 22.206 mi (35.737 km)
- Existed: 1914 as a state highway; 1931 as SR-59–present

Major junctions
- South end: SR 389 in Hildale/Colorado City, AZ
- North end: SR-9 in Hurricane

Location
- Country: United States
- State: Utah

Highway system
- Utah State Highway System; Interstate; US; State; Minor; Scenic
← SR-58	→ SR-60

State Route 59 (SR-59) is a state highway in the U.S. state of Utah. The highway connects Hurricane to the twin cities of Hildale and Colorado City, Arizona. The highway connects to US-89A through Arizona State Route 389. The route was added to the state highway system in 1914, and has had several designations.

== Route description ==
The route begins at the Arizona border in Hildale (whose Arizona counterpart is Colorado City). These two towns are largely known for the Fundamentalist Church of Jesus Christ of Latter-day Saints (or the FLDS), a Mormon fundamentalist sect that broke away the mainstream Church of Jesus Christ of Latter-day Saints (or the LDS). The highway proceeds northwest past Hildale (where the street is known as State Street) for nearly 15 miles before beginning a 5-mile (8 km) descent into Hurricane. A runaway truck ramp is located along this descent. The route enters Hurricane on 100 South and proceeds to turn north on Main Street. The route proceeds for a block before terminating at SR-9 (State Street).

The northernmost 3.3 miles (5.3 km) of the route is included in the National Highway System.

== History ==
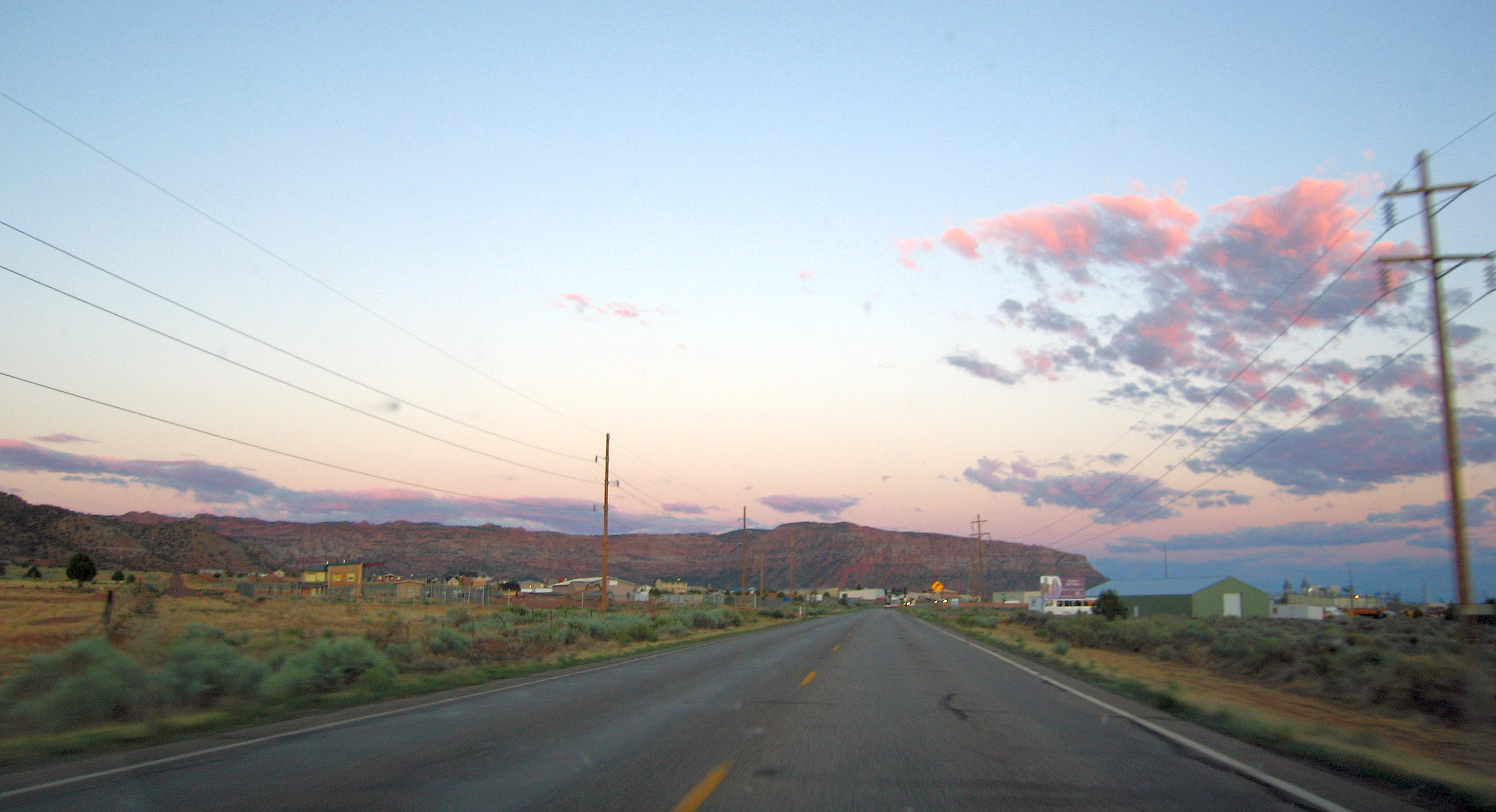
Looking southbound on SR-59 towards Hildale

The road from SR-15 (now SR-9 and SR-17) at La Verkin Junction south to Hurricane was added to the state highway system in 1912, and in 1914 it was extended southeast via Big Plain Junction to Arizona. In the 1920s, the entire route was numbered State Route 16. A connection from SR-15 (now SR-9) in Rockville south to SR-16 at Big Plain Junction became a state highway in 1925. In 1927, SR-16 was moved to the Rockville-Arizona route, and the roadway between La Verkin and Big Plain Junctions became part of the new SR-17, which also went southwest from Hurricane to SR-1 (US-91, now I-15). The Hurricane-Big Plain Junction branch was split from SR-17 in 1931, becoming a new State Route 59. The entirety of SR-16 was deleted in 1935, permanently removing the Rockville-Big Plain Junction road from the state highway system; the highway beyond Big Plain Junction to Arizona was also removed, but was re-added in 1941 as part of SR-59, forming the present extent of that route. SR-59 was almost completed relocated in 1962, including a new crossing of the state line; it had ended at the west end of Uzona Avenue, which extends west along the border from Colorado City/Hildale, but now crosses within the city limits. The connecting State Route 389 in Arizona was not added to that state's state highway system until 1959.

== Major intersections ==
The entire route is in Washington County.

Location	mi	km	Destinations	Notes
Hildale	0.000	0.000	SR 389 east – Colorado City, Fredonia	Southern terminus
Hurricane	22.206	35.737	SR-9 (State Street) – La Verkin	Northern terminus
1.000 mi = 1.609 km; 1.000 km = 0.621 mi
