= Shaye Scott =

American social media personality

- Born: St. George, Utah, U.S.
- Occupation: social media personality
- Spouse: Amanda Scott
- Children: 3

TikTok information
- Page: shayescott
- Followers: 517.8K
- Last updated: February 21, 2026

Shaye Scott is an American social media personality.

== Early life ==
Scott was born in St. George, Utah and raised in The Church of Jesus Christ of Latter-day Saints. She is the youngest of ten children and grew up in Bloomington, Utah. Through her father, she descends from Mormon pioneers. Through her mother, she descends from indigenous people in Oklahoma. Scott experienced gender dysphoria as a child. After expressing her gender dysphoria to her parents, she was given a patriarchal blessing.

== Career and social media presence ==
Scott is one of the founders and executive producers of The Piano Guys.

She is a popular social media personality and content creator on TikTok, Instagram, Facebook, and YouTube. She documents a lot of her family life and her gender transition on the social media platform. One video she posted, inquiring from her followers whether or not she should have a vow renewal with her wife, gaining around 24 million views.

== Personal life ==
She married her wife, Amanda, in a Mormon ceremony in 2006. They have three children: Emmeline, Hudson, and Desmond. They live in St. George, Utah. In 2019, Scott came out to her wife as a transgender woman while the two were on vacation in Laguna Beach, California. Later that year, she began hormone replacement therapy. In April 2023, Scott underwent facial feminization surgery and began to socially gender transition. They renewed their vows in 2026.

She and her wife left the Mormon faith.

She is the sister of Skylar Scott.
