= Hurricane, Utah =

City in Utah, United States

- City
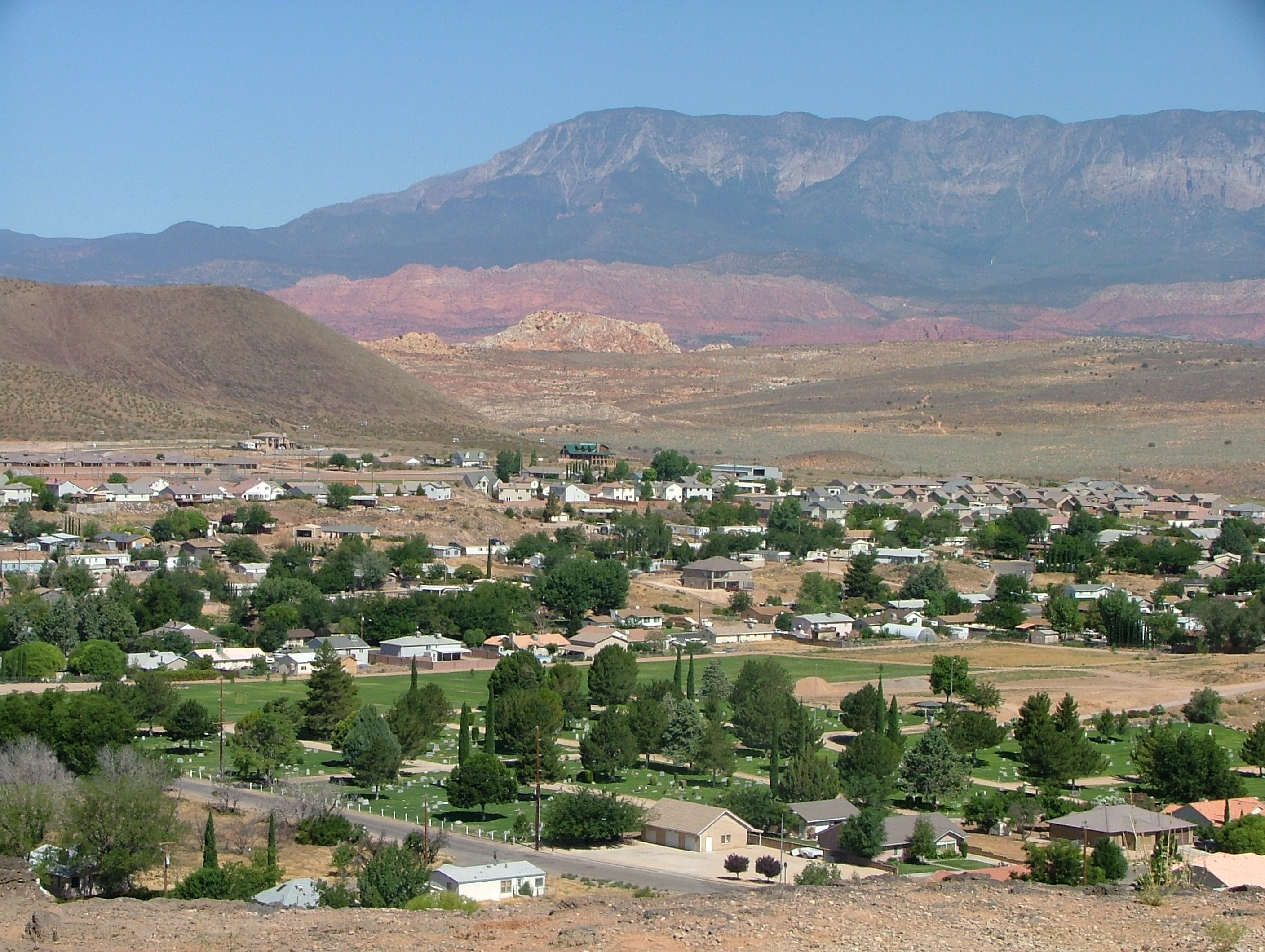
- Hurricane, Utah in July 2009

- Location in Washington County and the state of Utah
- Coordinates: 37°08′50″N 113°22′00″W
- Country: United States
- State: Utah
- County: Washington
- Settled: 1896

Area
  - Total: 53.63 sq mi (138.90 km^{2})
  - Land: 52.76 sq mi (136.64 km^{2})
  - Water: 0.88 sq mi (2.27 km^{2})
- Elevation: 3,258 ft (993 m)

Population (2020)
  - Total: 20,036
  - Density: 362/sq mi (139.6/km^{2})
- Time zone: UTC-7 (Mountain (MST))
  - Summer (DST): UTC-6 (MDT)
- ZIP code: 84737
- Area code: 435
- FIPS code: 49-37170
- GNIS feature ID: 2410082
- Website: www.cityofhurricane.com

Hurricane (/ˈhʌrɪkən/ HURR-ih-kən) is a city in Washington County, Utah, United States. Its population was 20,036 as of the 2020 United States Census estimates. The Hurricane valley makes up the easternmost part of the St. George metropolitan area. Hurricane contains peach and pecan orchards.

== History ==
Hurricane was first settled in 1896 and received its name after a whirlwind blew the top off a buggy in which Erastus Snow was riding. Snow exclaimed, "Well, that was a Hurricane. We'll name this 'Hurricane Hill'." The community was settled as part of The Church of Jesus Christ of Latter-day Saints's (LDS Church) President Brigham Young's "Cotton Mission", intended to establish the southern end of Utah for agricultural purposes. The town once operated a large peach and apricot orchard for the LDS Church and is historically known for small farms of peaches, pecans, and pistachio nuts.

The 1992 St. George earthquake destroyed three houses and various utilities, causing about US$1 million in damage.

== Geography ==
The Virgin River forms nearly all of Hurricane's north border. It travels through the city's Confluence Park and crosses State Route 9 at both the Hurricane-La Verkin border and near Quail Creek 3 miles from Harrisburg Junction. The river indirectly provides water to Hurricane and most of Washington County.

According to the United States Census Bureau, the city has a total area of 31.5 square miles (82 km^{2}), of which 31.1 square miles (81 km^{2}) is land and 0.4 square miles (1.0 km^{2}) (1.39%) is water.

== Demographics ==
Historical population
Census	Pop.	Note	%±
1910	336		—
1920	1,021		203.9%
1930	1,197		17.2%
1940	1,524		27.3%
1950	1,271		−16.6%
1960	1,251		−1.6%
1970	1,408		12.5%
1980	2,660		88.9%
1990	3,915		47.2%
2000	8,250		110.7%
2010	13,748		66.6%
2020	20,036		45.7%
U.S. Decennial Census

=== 2020 census ===
As of the 2020 census, Hurricane had a population of 20,036, a median age of 38.7 years, 26.4% of residents under the age of 18, and 21.5% of residents 65 years of age or older. For every 100 females there were 102.8 males, and for every 100 females age 18 and over there were 101.4 males age 18 and over.

78.9% of residents lived in urban areas, while 21.1% lived in rural areas.

There were 6,982 households in Hurricane, of which 31.7% had children under the age of 18 living in them. Of all households, 61.9% were married-couple households, 14.0% were households with a male householder and no spouse or partner present, and 19.5% were households with a female householder and no spouse or partner present. About 21.2% of all households were made up of individuals and 11.5% had someone living alone who was 65 years of age or older.

There were 8,035 housing units, of which 13.1% were vacant. The homeowner vacancy rate was 1.7% and the rental vacancy rate was 9.3%.

Racial composition as of the 2020 census
Race	Number	Percent
White	17,208	85.9%
Black or African American	84	0.4%
American Indian and Alaska Native	191	1.0%
Asian	153	0.8%
Native Hawaiian and Other Pacific Islander	124	0.6%
Some other race	856	4.3%
Two or more races	1,420	7.1%
Hispanic or Latino (of any race)	2,089	10.4%

=== 2010 census ===
At the 2010 census, there were 13,748 people, 4,609 households and 3,545 families residing in the city. The population density was 540 inhabitants per square mile (210/km^{2}). There were 5,461 housing units at an average density of 435.8 per square mile (168.3/km^{2}). The racial makeup of the city was 91.3% White, 0.5% African American, 1.3% Native American, 0.5% Asian, 0.8% Pacific Islander, 3.32% from other races, and 2.3% from two or more races. Hispanic or Latino of any race were 2.72% of the population.

There were 4,609 households, of which 34.1% had children under the age of 18 living with them, 65.4% were married couples living together, 8% had a female householder with no husband present, and 23.1% were non-families. 19.5% of all households were made up of individuals, and 9.6% had someone living alone who was 65 years of age or older. The average household size was 2.87 and the average family size was 3.32.

Age distribution was 32.3% under the age of 19, 5.6% from 20 to 24, 11.2% from 25 to 44, 20.6% from 45 to 64, and 17.4% who were 65 years of age or older. The median age was 33.8 years. For every 100 females, there were 100.1 males. For every 100 females age 18 and over, there were 98.5 males.

The median household income was $32,865, and the median family income was $36,955. Males had a median income of $30,172 versus $19,588 for females. The per capita income for the city was $13,353. About 10.8% of families and 13.1% of the population were below the poverty line, including 19.2% of those under age 18 and 5.9% of those age 65 or over.

== Economy ==
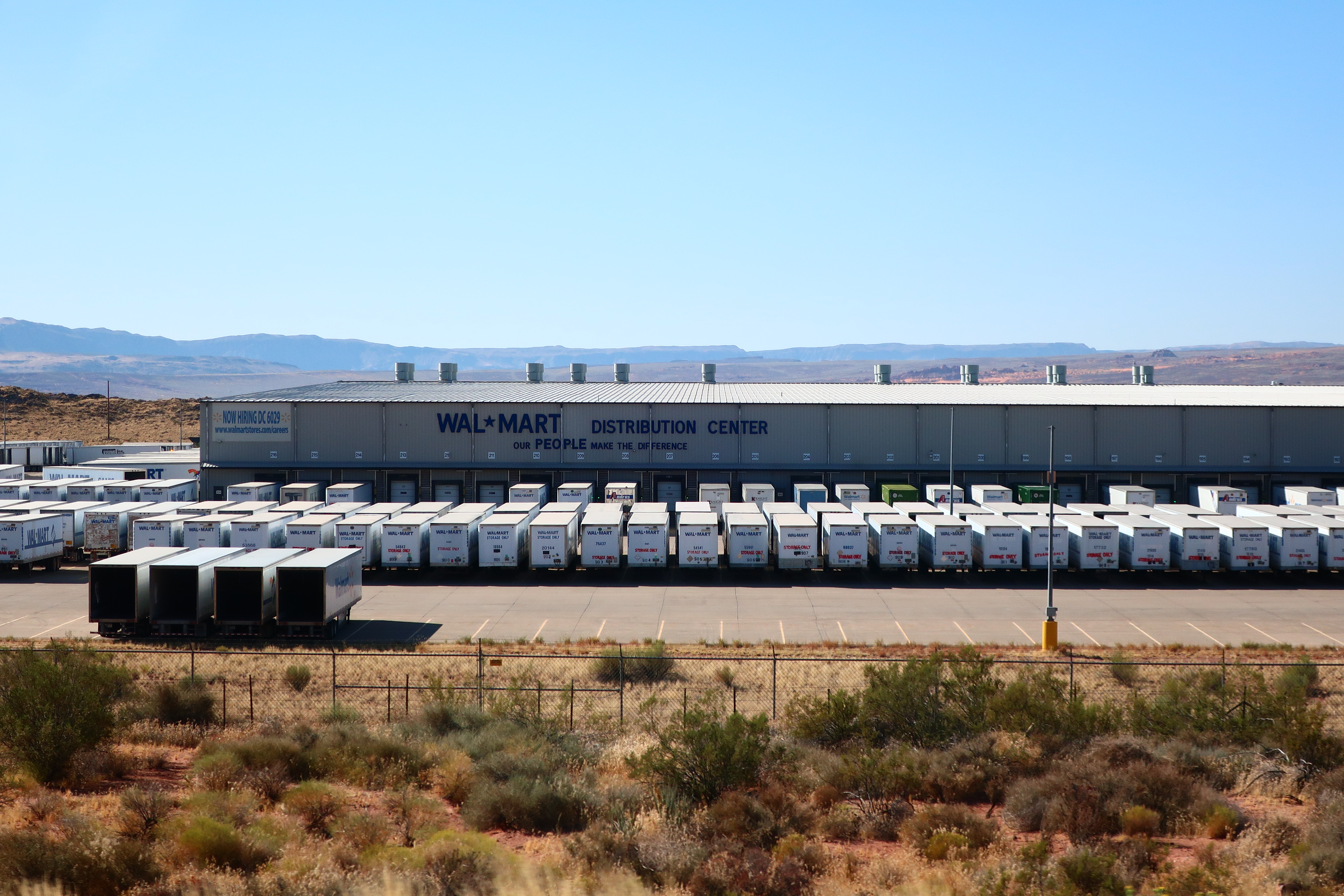
Walmart distribution center in Hurricane

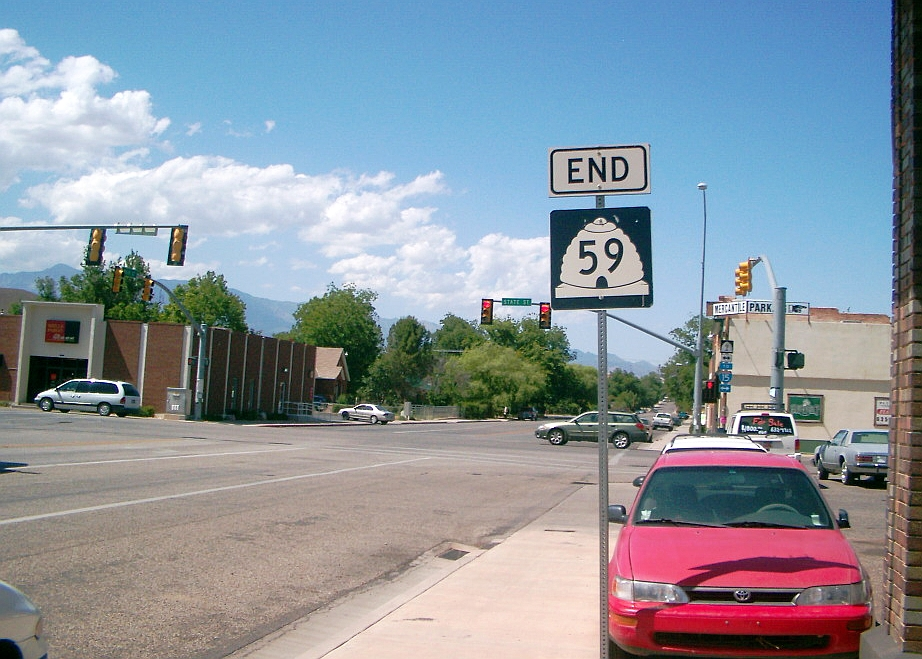
State Street and Main Street

Hurricane hosts an annual mountain bike festival, and several mountain bike trails are located nearby.

Distribution centers for Walmart, Orgill, Pepsi-Cola, BlvdHome, and PrimeSource Sanitary Supply are located in Hurricane.

== Arts and culture ==
Seven sites in Hurricane are listed on the National Register of Historic Places.

== Parks and recreation ==
Hurricane Canal was completed in 1904, and has been empty since 1985. A recreational trail is located next to the canal.

Sand Hollow State Park features a 1,322-acre (535 ha) reservoir, camping, and trails.

Quail Creek State Park features a 600-acre (240 ha) reservoir and a campground.

== Education ==
Hurricane is a part of the Washington County School District. Hurricane has one high school, Hurricane High School (encompassing grades 10–12), attended also by students from the surrounding communities including La Verkin, Toquerville, and Springdale. There are two elementary schools, an intermediate school (grades 6–7), a middle school (grades 8–9), and one charter school, Valley Academy (grades K-8).

== Infrastructure ==
=== Transportation ===
Highways:

- I-15
- SR-9
- SR-59
- SR-7

Hurricane Municipal Airport has one runway and services small aircraft.

== Notable people ==
- Oliver DeMille, author, educator, and public speaker
- Derral Eves, co-founder of The Chosen
- Don Leo Jonathan, wrestler
- James Judd, legislator, businessman, and LDS church leader
- Bradley Last, politician in the Utah House of Representatives
- W. Paul Reeve, historian and professor at the University of Utah
- Donald L. Staheli, business executive and general authority of the LDS church
- Herb Wilkinson, All American basketball player at Iowa
- Sylvan Wittwer, agronomist who developed a chemical called Gibberellins

== In popular culture ==
Part of Katy Perry's "Rise" music video was filmed in Sand Hollow State Park, with Sullivan Knoll featured in the background in July 2016.

The Five Nights at Freddy's video game franchise takes place in Hurricane, as revealed in the tie-in novel The Silver Eyes.

== See also ==
- List of cities and towns in Utah
- Purgatory Correctional Facility
