= Maximum Life Skills Academy =

Defunct therapeutic boarding school in Utah, United States

- Cedar City, UT, 84721; Iron County, Utah; United States

Information
- School type: Private youth behavioral modification program
- Established: May 2002
- Founder: Max AhQuin, Sunny AhQuin, Adam Ah Quin, Clayton AhQuin Sr.
- Status: Closed
- Closed: 2004
- Director: Adam AhQuin
- Grades: 7-12
- Gender: All-Boys
- Capacity: 11

Maximum Life Skills Academy was a privately owned behavioral youth modification center in Cedar City, Utah. The facility operated for approximately two years before shutting down following the murder of a staff member by two youths in the program.

== History ==
The Maximum Life Skills Academy was licensed in May 2002 as a privately owned youth behavioral modification program and was part of the troubled teen industry. The program could accommodate roughly 11 male students aged 11–17 prior to its closure. It was founded by Adam Ah Quin, Max Ah Quin, and Sunny Ah Quin, who were listed as directors and officers, with Sunny also serving as secretary. Clayton AhQuin Sr., who also founded Liahona Academy, was named as a potential owner and founder of Maximum Life Skills Academy. Adam AhQuin later founded the all-female troubled teen program Second Chances In Southern Utah.

As a direct result of Arnett's death, Maximum Life Skills Academy's license was revoked in May 2004, citing 22 violations, including inadequate staffing, failure to obtain criminal background checks, and violating National Interstate Compact Laws. OSHA issued the academy a $1,500 citation for the fatal incident on July 1, 2004.

The AhQuins initially planned to appeal the closure of Maximum Life Skills Academy but withdrew the appeal, as it was revealed that they instead intended to apply for another program license to found a new troubled teen program in a different location in Cedar City, Ut. State documents from September 2004 verified that the AhQuins were listed as named parties in founding this other troubled teen facility, the program was designated to be named "A+ Academy." The program's president at the time, Scott Smith, claimed he intended to remove all the AhQuins with the exception of Sunny AhQuin from the proposed A+ Academy program employee roster.

== Murder of Anson Arnett ==
On March 8, 2004, 31-year-old staff member Anson Arnett, who was alone with six program attendees, was ambushed and beaten with an aluminum baseball bat by two 17-year-old attendees, Jesse Simmons from Delaware and Sean Graham from Baltimore. After sustaining at least two traumatic blows to the head, Arnett was locked upside-down in a nearby closet by Graham, who then cut the building's phone line. The duo stole a program van, a television, and a lockbox containing prescription medications and then fled to Las Vegas, Nevada. The four other boys in the program ran to the director’s home some distance away, but when he was not there, they rushed to the home of another staff member. By the time help arrived at approximately 11:30 p.m., medical attention for Arnett had been delayed by 1.5 hours. He was rushed to a Cedar City hospital and then flown to Salt Lake City’s LDS Hospital, where he died the following day from his injuries.

Both Simmons and Graham were later caught by Las Vegas authorities, extradited back to Utah, and charged in Cedar City's 5th District Court as adults under Utah law, which mandates adult trials for individuals over 16 who commit aggravated murder. Simmons pleaded guilty to first-degree felony murder and was sentenced to five years to life in prison, while Graham was convicted of murder, aggravated kidnapping, and theft, receiving a sentence of 15 years to life. Simmons was released on parole in September 2022.
