= Sand Hollow Reservoir =

Reservoir in Washington County, Utah, United States

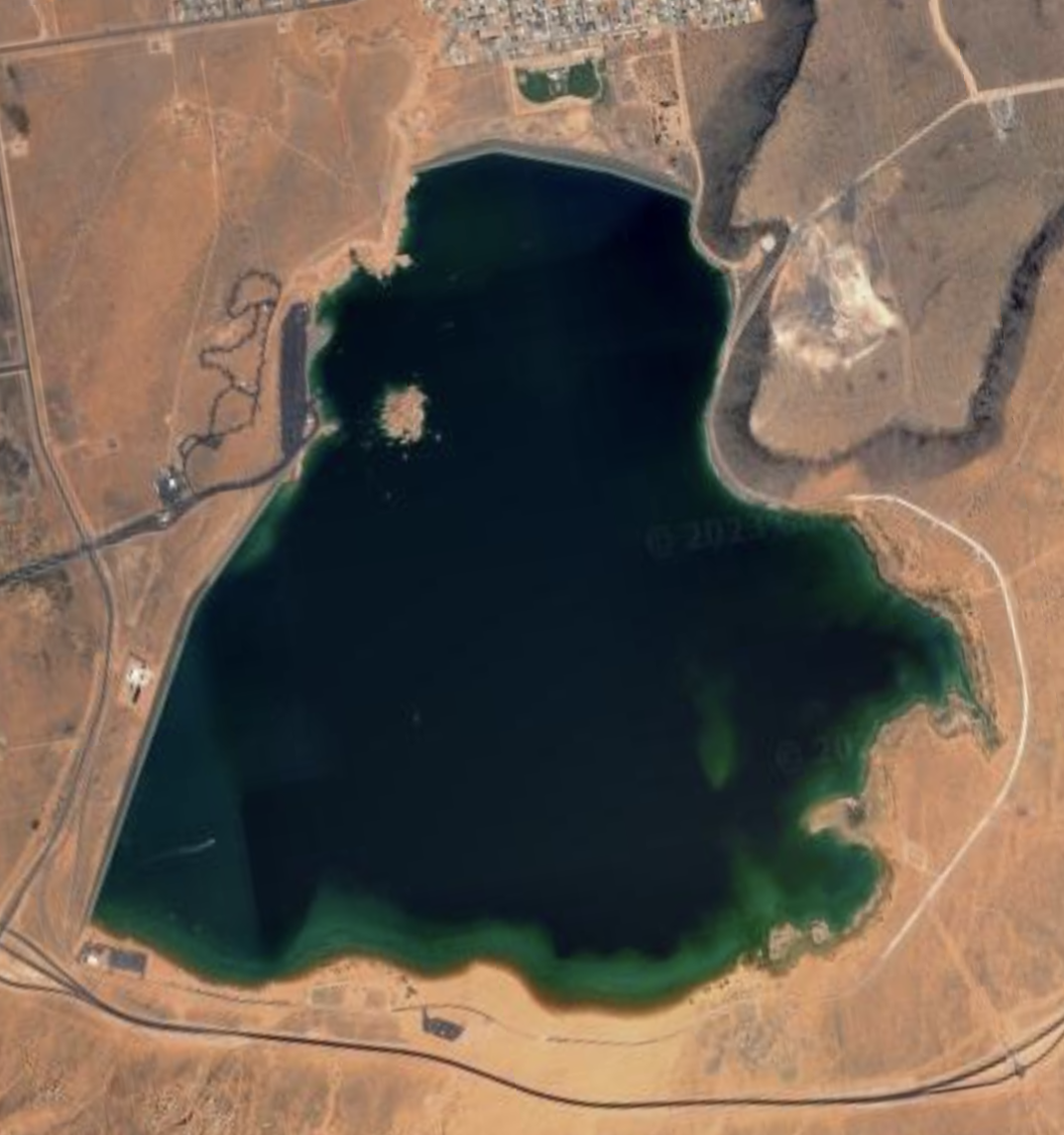
- Satellite photo of Sand Hollow Reservoir

- Location of within Utah Location within the United States
- Location: Sand Hollow State Park; Washington County, Utah, United States
- Coordinates: 37°11′38″N 113°37′34″W
- Type: Off-stream reservoir
- Primary inflows: Virgin River
- Basin countries: United States
- Surface area: 1,322 acres (5.35 km^{2})
- Max. depth: 95 ft (29 m)
- Water volume: 51,360 acre-feet (63,350,000 m^{3})
- Surface elevation: 3,000 ft (910 m)
- Website: stateparks.utah.gov/parks/sand-hollow/

Sand Hollow Reservoir is a reservoir located at Sand Hollow State Park in Washington County, Utah, United States. The lake opened to the public in 2003 making it the newest lake in Utah.

== See also ==
- Sand Hollow State Park
