= Utah State Route 7 =

State highway in Washington County, Utah, United States

State Route 7
- Southern Parkway
- SR-7 highlighted in red

Route information
- Maintained by UDOT
- Length: 26.1 mi (42.0 km)
- Existed: 2009–present

Major junctions
- West end: I-15 in St George
- East end: SR-9 in Hurricane

Location
- Country: United States
- State: Utah
- Counties: Washington

Highway system
- Utah State Highway System; Interstate; US; State; Minor; Scenic
← US 6	→ SR-8

State Route 7 (SR-7), also known as Southern Parkway, is a 26.1-mile (42.0 km) east-west state highway in southern Washington County in the extreme southwestern portion of the US state of Utah. It connects the southern periphery of St. George with Hurricane, while providing access to the St. George Regional Airport.

== Route description ==
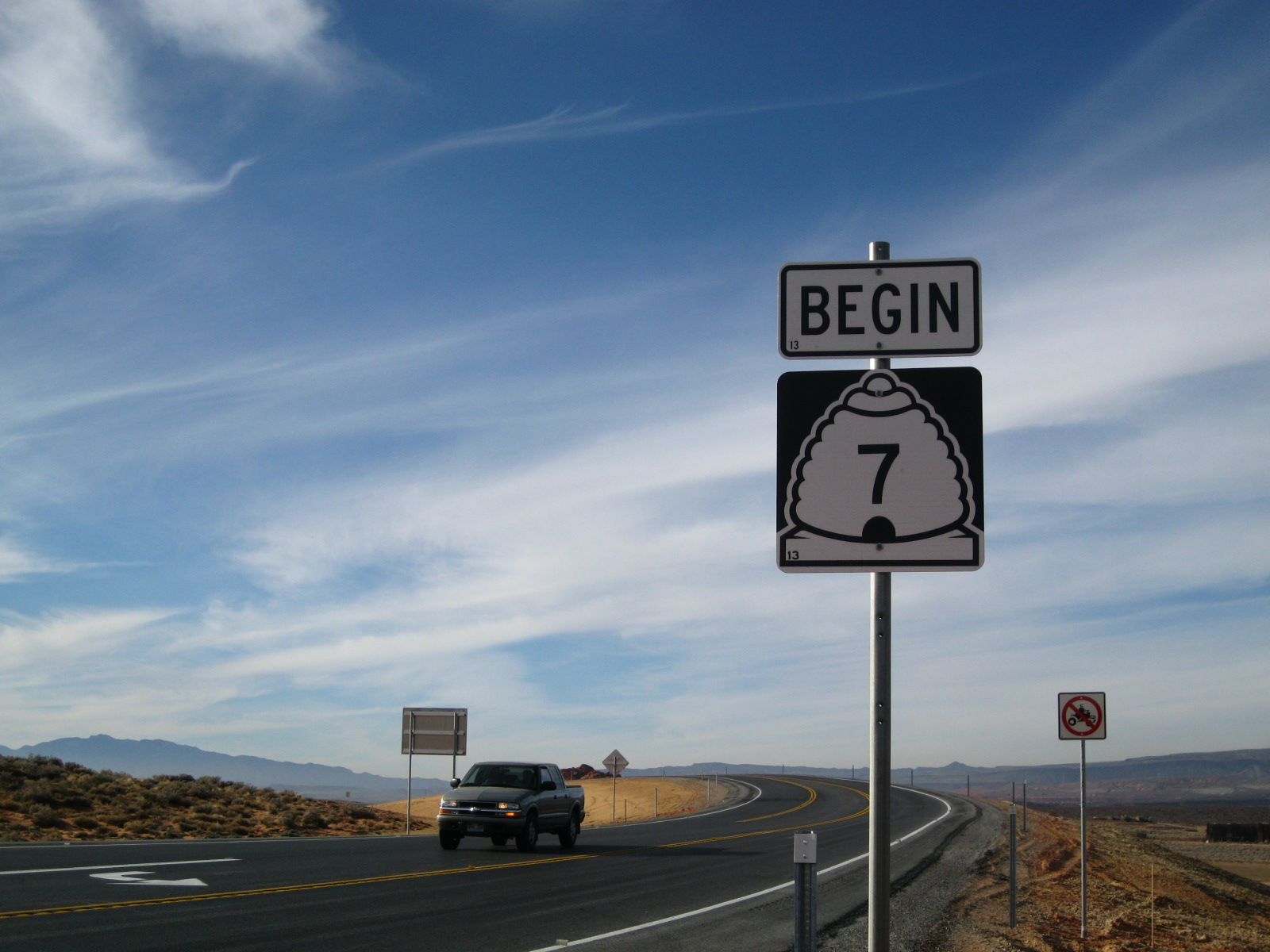
East on Utah State Route 7 from its western terminus, January 2014.

State Route 7 starts at its intersection with I-15 in southwest St. George. From here it travels southeast for about 3 miles (4.8 km) to immediately north of the Utah-Arizona border, then turning east and paralleling the border. Past interchanges at Desert Color Parkway and River Road, the road turns north-northeast and continues for 15 miles (24.1 km), passing Airport Parkway (which accesses the St. George Regional Airport) and Long Valley Road until reaching Sand Hollow Road, having an interchange with the road immediately southwest of Sand Hollow State Park. From this point onwards, State Route 7 continues east for an additional 8 miles (12.9 km), following the southern boundary of Sand Hollow State Park before gradually curving north and ending at an intersection with State Route 9 just west of downtown Hurricane.

The entire route is included in the National Highway System.

== History ==
Since the 1977 Utah state route renumbering, no route in Utah had been designated as State Route 7, until 2009 when the Utah State Legislature added the Southern Parkway from Pioneer Road to River Road to the state highway system.

The first portion of the freeway opened July 7, 2009, a link between Exit 2 at I-15 south of Bloomington (a suburb within the city of St. George) to River Road in south St. George spanning 4 miles (6.4 km). The second portion was completed in November 2010, extending further east to the new St. George Regional Airport. The third and final segment of State Route 7 between Sand Hollow Road and State Route 9 would finally open to traffic on May 20, 2021. The highway began as a mostly two-lane highway with at-grade intersections, envisioned to eventually be converted to a four-lane divided freeway. The majority of these intersections have been updated to the planned interchanges.

== Major intersections ==
The entire route is in Washington County.

Location	mi	km	Exit	Destinations	Notes
St. George	0.000	0.000		I-15 – Las Vegas, Salt Lake City	Western terminus; Southern Parkway continues as Sun River Parkway; I-15 exit 2
St. George	0.444	0.715	1	Desert Color Parkway	Formerly Astragalus Drive
St. George	3.251	5.232	3	River Road	
St. George			5	Southern Hills Drive	Proposed interchange; construction to begin in 2027
St. George	5.911	9.513	6	Desert Canyons Parkway	East end of freeway section; west end of Super Two
St. George	7.082	11.397	7	Airport Parkway	
Washington			8	3650 South	Proposed interchange
Washington	10.385	16.713	10	Warner Valley Road	Connection to Washington Fields Road
Washington			12	George Washington Boulevard	New diamond interchange opened in August 2024
Washington	14.720	23.690	15	Long Valley Road	Connection to Washington Dam Road
	18.299	29.449	18	Sand Hollow Road	
			19	3200 West	Eastbound exit and entrance only; future full interchange
Hurricane	22.9	36.9	22	3000 South	
Hurricane	26.1	42.0		SR-9 – Hurricane	Interchange; eastern terminus; Southern Parkway continues north
1.000 mi = 1.609 km; 1.000 km = 0.621 mi: Incomplete access; Unopened

== See also ==
- List of state highways in Utah
- List of highways numbered 7
