= 1992 St. George earthquake =

1992 earthquake

- Location within Utah
- UTC time: 1992-09-02 10:26
- ISC event: 271074
- USGS-ANSS: ComCat
- Local date: September 2, 1992; 33 years ago
- Local time: 04:26 a.m. MDT
- Magnitude: 5.8 M_{w}
- Depth: 13.9 km (8.6 mi)
- Epicenter: 37.1°N 113.497°W
- Fault: Hurricane Fault
- Areas affected: Utah, southern Nevada, northwest Arizona
- Total damage: US$1 million
- Max. intensity: MMI VII (Very strong)
- Peak acceleration: 0.233 g
- Peak velocity: 2.998 cm/s
- Casualties: None

The 1992 St. George earthquake was a M_{w} 5.8 earthquake that occurred on September 2, 1992 at approximately 4:26 AM MDT along the Washington Fault zone near the larger Hurricane Fault about 5 miles (8.0 km) southeast of St. George in Utah, United States. The quake triggered a landslide that destroyed three houses and caused approximately US$1 million in structural and cosmetic damage to houses, roads, natural formations, and utilities. No people were killed by the quake.

== Earthquake ==
At 4:26 AM MDT on September 2, 1992, a magnitude 5.8 earthquake occurred along the Washington Fault zone near the larger Hurricane Fault about 5 miles (8.0 km) southeast of St. George in Utah, United States.

=== Magnitude ===
Reports on the magnitude of the earthquake vary. The University of Utah reported the quake as a M_{w} 5.8 in their official report via the Intermountain Seismic Belt Historical Earthquake Project, which is supported by a 1994 news article from the Deseret News and an official report from the Utah Geological Survey. A contemporaneous report from the journal Arizona Geology reported M_{w} 5.5 from the University of Arizona and M_{w} 5.9 from the USGS.

== Destruction ==
Most of the force of the earthquake was directed away from the city of St. George toward Hurricane and Springdale. In the Balanced Rock Hills area of Springdale, a landslide covered part of Utah State Route 9, taking several hours to complete movement. The slide was about 1,600 feet (490 m) long and 3,600 feet (1,100 m) wide, contained boulders up to 20 feet (6.1 m) in diameter, with a total volume of 18,000,000 cubic yards (14,000,000 m^{3}) and total area of 4,400,400 square feet (408,810 m^{2}). It destroyed three houses as well as above- and below-ground utilities, causing about US$1 million in damage.

== See also ==
- List of earthquakes in 1992
- List of earthquakes in the United States
- List of earthquakes in Utah
- List of earthquakes in Nevada
