= Sylvan Wittwer =

American agronomist (1917–2012)

Sylvan Harold Wittwer (January 17, 1917 – January 20, 2012) was an American agronomist who served as director of the agricultural experiment station at Michigan State University.

Wittwer was born in 1917 in Hurricane, Utah. He received his bachelor's degree at Utah State University and his doctors degree from the University of Missouri. He was inducted into the Alumni Hall of Honor of the College of Agriculture and Applied Science at Utah State University, 2003.

Wittwer developed a chemical known as Gibberellins. He wrote Feeding a Billion (1987) and Food, Climate, and Carbon Dioxide: The Global Environment and World Food Production (1995). Another book he wrote was Greenhouse Tomatoes, Lettuce and Cucumber (1979).

Wittwer served as the first president of the Lansing Michigan Stake of the Church of Jesus Christ of Latter-day Saints (LDS Church) beginning in 1962. Wittwer had also served as the first bishop of the church's Lansing Ward beginning in 1952.

Wittwer was a member of the board of the Greening Earth Society and the Center for the Study of Carbon Dioxide and Global Change. Wittwer authored "Feeding a Billion" in 1987 published by Michigan State University Press with cover design by Lynne Brown.

Wittwer was on the board of directors of Deseret Valley Academy, an anticipated independent LDS liberal arts college.
