= Bloomington, Utah =

Neighborhood in St. George, Utah, United States

Bloomington
- Neighborhood
- Location of Bloomington in within the State of Utah
- Coordinates: 37°02′48″N 113°36′22″W
- Country: United States
- State: Utah
- County: Washington
- City: St. George
- Settled: 1870
- Founder: William Carpenter
- Elevation: 769 m (2,523 ft)

Population
  - Total: 10,053
- Time zone: UTC-7 (Mountain)
  - Summer (DST): UTC-6 (Mountain)
- ZIP code: 84790
- Area code: 435
- GNIS feature ID: 1437504

Bloomington is a community in southern Washington County, Utah, United States, which now forms the southwestern part of the city of St. George. The community was annexed into St. George on December 15, 1982.

Access to Bloomington is achieved by Interstate 15's interchange with Brigham Road (Exit 4), Southern Parkway (SR-7) Exit 2, or by Tonaquint Drive on the north side of the "Bloomington Circle".

== Notable events ==
In 2005, there was significant flooding in the Washington County area. The Man-O-War bridge usually remained opened; however, it was closed for a few hours at a time during the worst of the flooding. The community gathered together to sandbag and protect homes along the Virgin River. Although many were flooded, no houses were swept away as they were in the Green Valley area.

== Man O War Bridge ==
The Man O War Bridge crosses the Virgin River and connects the "Bloomington Circle" to I-15 via Pioneer Road.

== Climate ==
According to the Köppen Climate Classification system, Bloomington has a semi-arid climate, abbreviated "BSk" on climate maps.

== Notable people ==
- Texas Rose Bascom (1922-1993), rodeo trick rider and fancy trick roper, Hollywood actress, hall of fame inductee
- Shaye Scott, social media personality
