= James Judd (legislator) =

American politician (1884–1961)

James Judd (1884–1961) was a Utah businessman and politician who also was a leader within the Church of Jesus Christ of Latter-day Saints (LDS Church).

Judd was born in southern Utah. In 1906 he married Maud MacFarland.

From 1914 to 1916 Judd served as a missionary for the LDS Church in the United Kingdom. In the summer of 1928 he served as a missionary in Alaska, among the first three formally set apart missionaries there are the first to share the message of the church there in 15 years. He was president of the Australian Mission of the church from 1938 to 1941.

From 1922 to 1924 Judd was a member of the Utah State Legislature.

In business, Judd was vice president of the Bank of Hurricane, the owner-operator of the Hurricane Mercantile Company, and for 22 years the owner-operator of the Arrowhead Hotel in St. George, Utah.

Judd died in La Verkin, Utah. He and his wife Maud were the parents of four children.

== Sources ==
- Fred E. Woods. Melting the Ice: The History of The Church of Jesus Christ of Latter-day Saints in Alaska. Provo, Utah: BYU Studies, 2018. Note 104 (note to Chapter 2).
