= Quail Creek State Park =

Reservoir in the state of Utah, United States

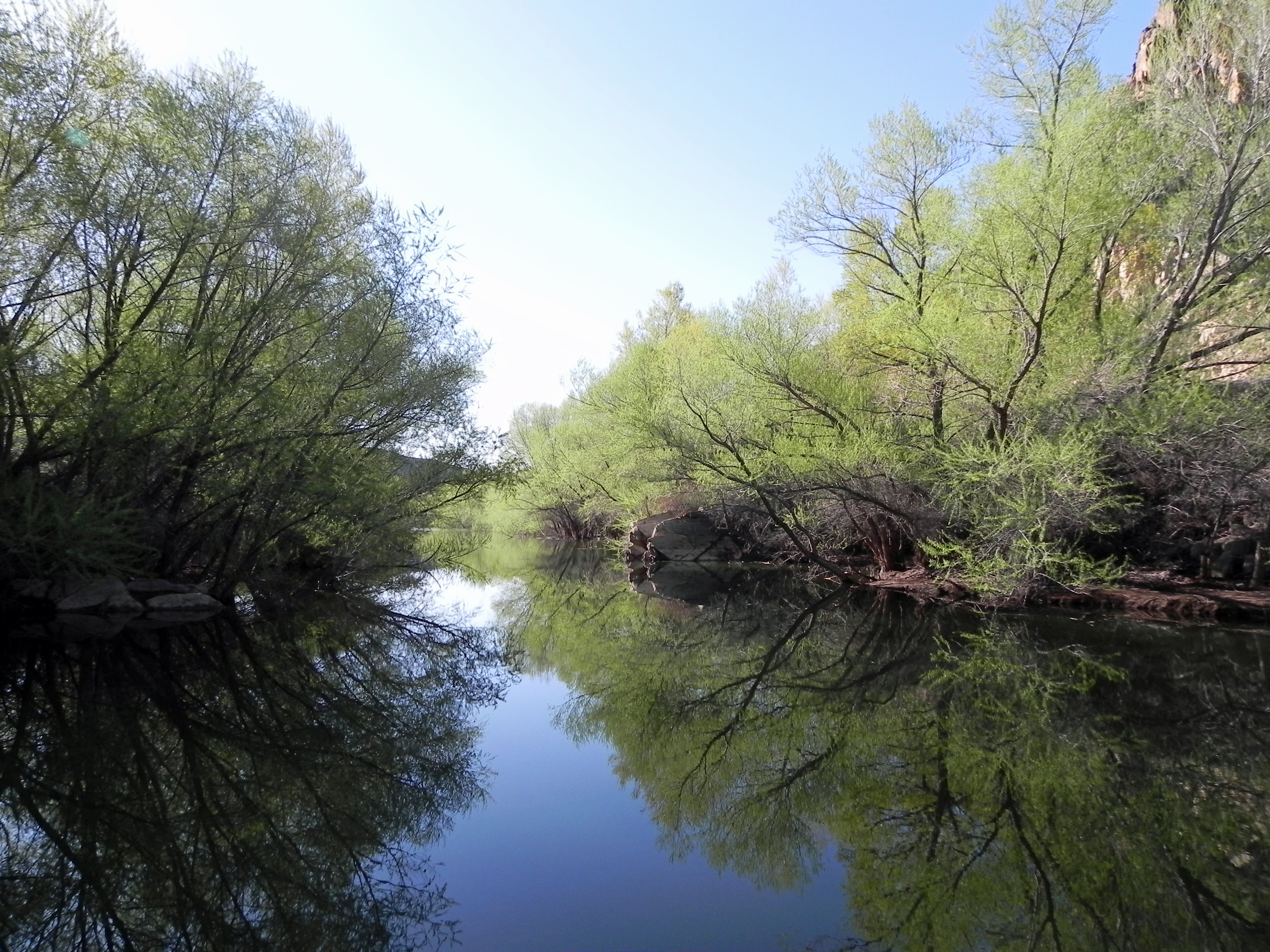
- Upper end of Quail Creek Reservoir

- Location within Utah Location within the United States
- Interactive map of Quail Creek State Park
- Location: Washington County, Utah, United States
- Coordinates: 37°11′33″N 113°23′7″W
- Elevation: 3,300 ft (1,000 m)
- Opened: 1986
- Operator: Utah State Parks
- Visitors: 337,913 (in 2025)
- Website: Official website
- Utah State Parks

Quail Creek State Park is a state park of Utah, United States, featuring a 600-acre (240 ha) reservoir. The park is located within Hurricane, Utah, 9 miles (14 km) west of the city center and 1.5 miles (2.4 km) south of the historic ghost town of Harrisburg. Quail Creek State Park offers camping, boating, swimming, and fishing.

The maximum depth of Quail Creek reaches up to 120 feet (37 m) and is cold enough to sustain the stocked rainbow trout, bullhead catfish, and crappie. Largemouth bass and bluegill, which are also stocked, thrive in the warmer, upper layers of the reservoir.

== History ==
Quail Creek reservoir was completed in 1985 to provide irrigation and culinary water to the St. George area. Most of the water in the reservoir does not come from Quail Creek, but is diverted from the Virgin River and transported through a buried pipeline. Two dams form the reservoir. The main dam is an earthfill embankment dam. The south dam is a roller-compacted concrete dam, constructed to replace the original earthfill dam that failed in the early hours of New Year's Day 1989.

== Naming ==
The name came from the considerable population of quail that lived along its upper drainage in the 19th and early 20th century. They did not survive one particularly hard winter. The name of Anthony Quayle, who is sometimes acknowledge to be its namesake, is a different spelling and does not have any historical connection to this particular drainage.

== Misnaming ==
The name Quail Creek has been misplaced on current area maps. The true location was described in the Quail Creek Decree, a judgment declared by the Fifth Judicial District Court of Washington County, Utah, on March 5, 1923, which assigns water from Quail Creek to the areas along its stream. The Decree defines Quail Creek as "a natural stream of water which with all its tributaries lies within Washington County, State of Utah; ...said stream rises in the Pine Valley Mountains and flows in a southeasterly direction to a junction with the Virgin River in said county."

The Decree describes Quail Creek as "a fluctuating stream" and states that "all of the waters thereof are of such quality that they may be applied to beneficial uses for culinary, domestic and other purposes."

The true Quail Creek is fed by numerous tributaries issuing from the southern face of Pine Valley Mountain, and provides agricultural and domestic water to area residents as described in the Quail Creek Decree.

Current maps have erroneously applied the label "Leeds Creek", but the naming of the creek predates the availability of the name Leeds. The name Leeds Creek was given by 19th century settlers to the manmade ditch they created to bring water from Quail Creek to their farms and community. The canyon that is mistakenly labeled Quail Creek on recent maps is a small, dry canyon which has no tributaries. It is found in a completely different location, does not match the Decree's description, and represents a clerical error. Correct naming is crucial to the many historical facts and rights associated with this drainage.

The Quail Creek Decree and its related documents may be viewed by searching the name and accessing it through the Utah Division of Water Rights web site.
