= Utah State Route 17 =

State highway in Utah, United States

State Route 17
- SR-17 highlighted in red

Route information
- Maintained by UDOT
- Length: 6.060 mi (9.753 km)
- Existed: 1969–present

Major junctions
- South end: SR-9 in La Verkin
- North end: I-15 at Anderson Junction

Location
- Country: United States
- State: Utah

Highway system
- Utah State Highway System; Interstate; US; State; Minor; Scenic
| ← SR-16 | → SR-18 |

State Route 17 (SR-17) is a state highway in southern Utah, running for 6.060 miles (9.753 km) in Washington County from La Verkin to Anderson Junction near Toquerville. It serves as a shortcut from I-15 to Zion National Park.

== Route description ==
The route begins at the junction of State Street and 500 North in the center of La Verkin and heads north on the latter, a two-lane undivided highway. After exiting La Verkin, the road turns northwest. South of Toquerville, the route curves between a north-northeast and north-northwest direction before steadying to a north-northeast direction. The route turns north-northwest and enters Toquerville as Toquer Boulevard. Exiting the town, the highway turns to the southwest briefly before turning north-northwest. The route turns west-northwest one final time before reverting to its original direction and terminating at exit 27 on I-15 at Anderson Junction, a diamond interchange.

== History ==
Until 1969, SR-17 and SR-9 (then SR-15) were swapped, with SR-15 following current SR-17 and SR-17 connecting US-91 at Harrisburg Junction with SR-15 at La Verkin Junction. The present SR-17 was added to the state highway system in 1912 and numbered as part of SR-15 in the 1920s.

== Major intersections ==
The entire route is in Washington County.

| Location | mi | km | Destinations | Notes |
|---|---|---|---|---|
| La Verkin | 0.000 | 0.000 | SR-9 (500 North) – Springdale | Southern terminus |
| Anderson Junction | 5.893 | 9.484 | I-15 – St. George, Cedar City | Northern terminus; I-15 exit 27 |
1.000 mi = 1.609 km; 1.000 km = 0.621 mi

== See also ==
- List of state highways in Utah
