= Sand Hollow State Park =

State park in Utah, United States

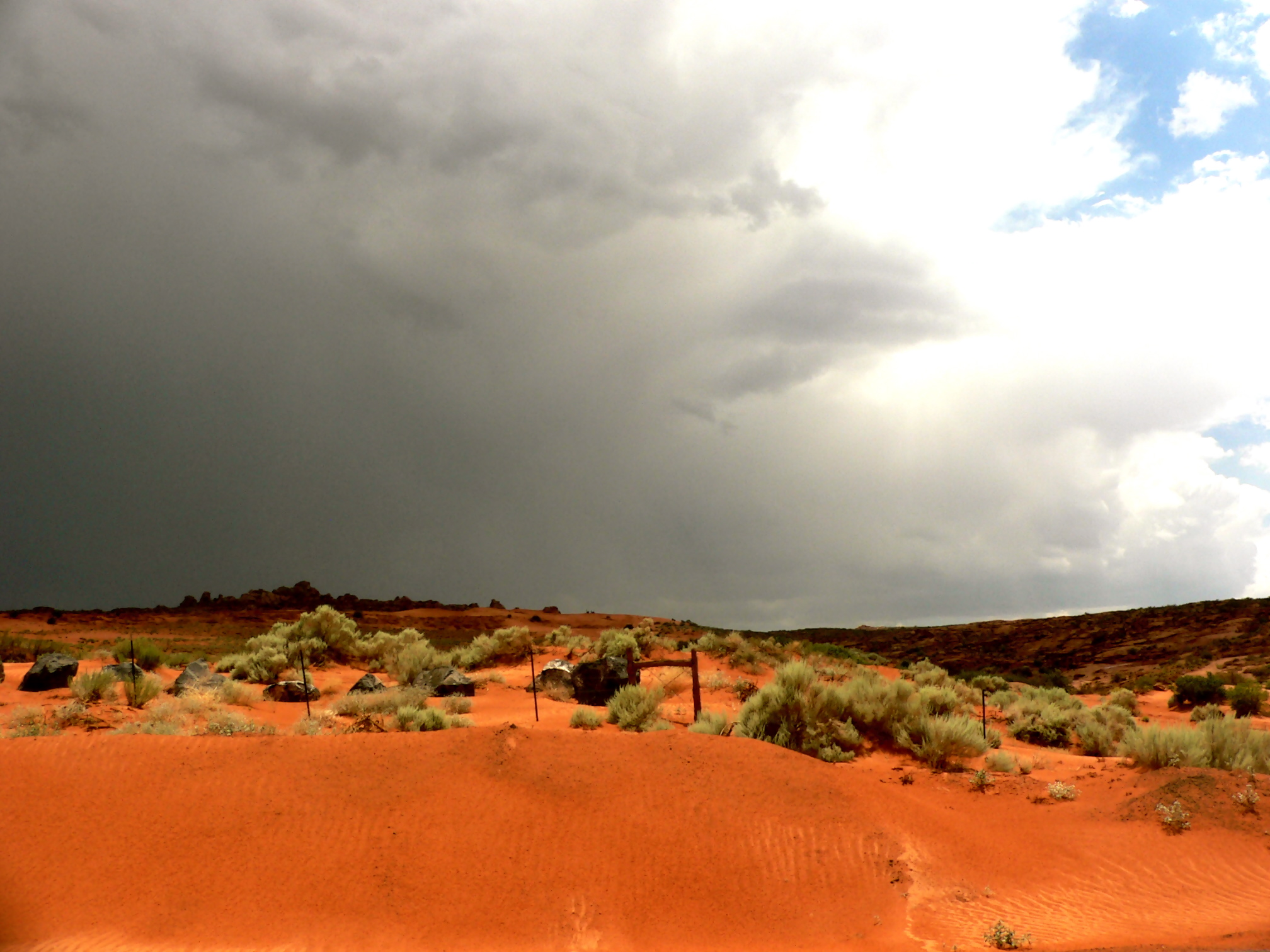
- Red Mountain in Sand Hollow State Park

- Location within Utah Location within the United States
- Interactive map of Sand Hollow State Park
- Location: Washington County, Utah, United States
- Coordinates: 37°6′56″N 113°22′35″W
- Area: 20,000 acres (8,100 ha)
- Elevation: 3,000 ft (910 m)
- Opened: 2003
- Operator: Utah State Parks
- Visitors: 1,357,405 (in 2025)
- Website: Official website
- Utah State Parks

Sand Hollow State Park is a state park located in Utah, United States, featuring a 1,322-acre (535 ha) reservoir and an extensive off highway vehicle recreation area on Sand Mountain. The park is near the town of Hurricane.

The park was officially dedicated in April 2003 and surrounds the Sand Hollow Reservoir. Sand Hollow quickly became a popular site for camping, fishing, boating, and ATV riding on nearby sand dunes.
