= Riverdale, Utah =

City in Utah, United States

- City
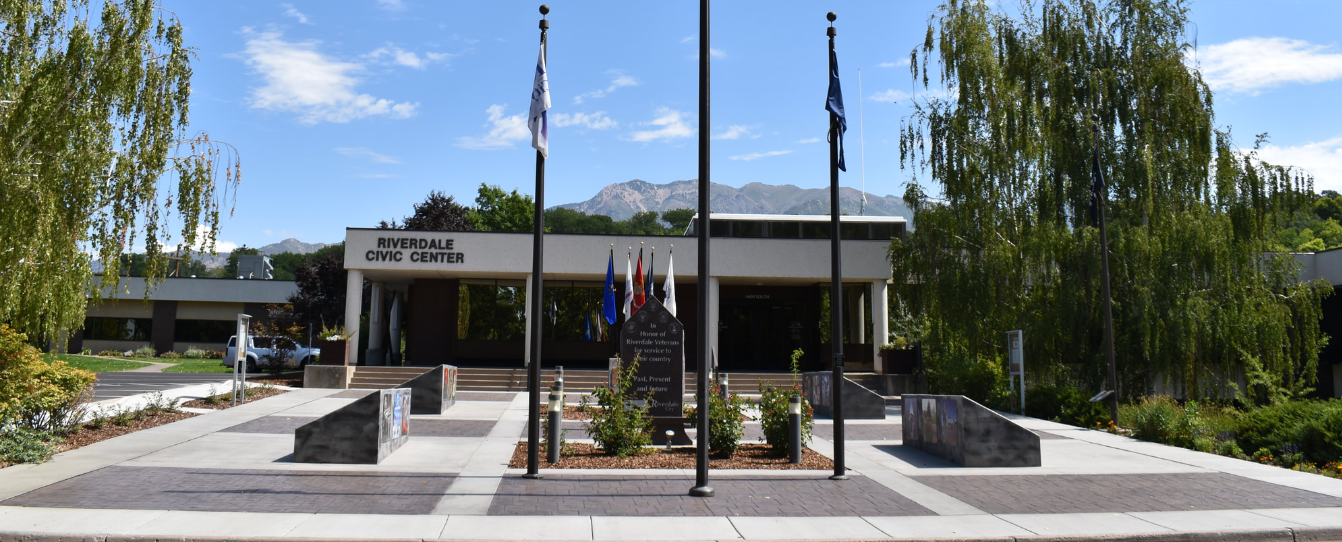
- Riverdale Civic Center, April 2024

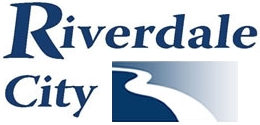
- Flag

- Location in Weber County and the state of Utah
- Coordinates: 41°10′30″N 111°59′50″W
- Country: United States
- State: Utah
- County: Weber
- Settled: 1850
- Incorporated: March 4, 1946
- Became a city: July 7, 1956

Area
  - Total: 4.63 sq mi (11.99 km^{2})
  - Land: 4.63 sq mi (11.99 km^{2})
  - Water: 0 sq mi (0.00 km^{2})
- Elevation: 4,370 ft (1,330 m)

Population (2020)
  - Total: 9,343
  - Density: 1,908.4/sq mi (736.84/km^{2})
- Time zone: UTC-7 (Mountain (MST))
  - Summer (DST): UTC-6 (MDT)
- ZIP code: 84405
- Area codes: 385, 801
- FIPS code: 49-64010
- GNIS feature ID: 2410963
- Website: Official website

Riverdale is a city in southern Weber County, Utah, United States. The population was 9,343 at the 2020 census. It is part of the Ogden–Clearfield, Utah Metropolitan Statistical Area.

== Geography ==
According to the United States Census Bureau, the city has a total area of 4.4 square miles (11 km^{2}), all land.

== Demographics ==
Historical population
Census	Pop.	Note	%±
1880	272		—
1890	489		79.8%
1900	282		−42.3%
1910	353		25.2%
1920	526		49.0%
1930	659		25.3%
1940	689		4.6%
1950	871		26.4%
1960	1,848		112.2%
1970	3,704		100.4%
1980	6,031		62.8%
1990	6,419		6.4%
2000	7,656		19.3%
2010	8,426		10.1%
2020	9,343		10.9%
2023 (est.)	9,160		−2.0%
U.S. Decennial Census

=== Racial and ethnic composition ===
Racial composition as of the 2020 census
Race	Number	Percent
White	7,308	78.2%
Black or African American	87	0.9%
American Indian and Alaska Native	72	0.8%
Asian	150	1.6%
Native Hawaiian and Other Pacific Islander	66	0.7%
Some other race	744	8.0%
Two or more races	916	9.8%
Hispanic or Latino (of any race)	1,751	18.7%

=== 2020 census ===
As of the 2020 census, Riverdale had a population of 9,343. The median age was 33.1 years, with 26.1% of residents under the age of 18 and 14.2% aged 65 or older. For every 100 females there were 104.4 males, and for every 100 females age 18 and over there were 100.0 males age 18 and over.

99.6% of residents lived in urban areas, while 0.4% lived in rural areas.

There were 3,435 households in Riverdale, of which 34.3% had children under the age of 18 living in them. Of all households, 49.6% were married-couple households, 19.5% were households with a male householder and no spouse or partner present, and 23.6% were households with a female householder and no spouse or partner present. About 25.8% of all households were made up of individuals and 10.3% had someone living alone who was 65 years of age or older.

There were 3,636 housing units, of which 5.5% were vacant. The homeowner vacancy rate was 2.3% and the rental vacancy rate was 6.2%.

=== 2000 census ===
As of the census of 2000, there were 7,656 people, 2,806 households, and 2,045 families residing in the city. The population density was 1,726.1 people per square mile (666.5 people/km^{2}). There were 2,970 housing units at an average density of 669.6 units per square mile (258.5 units/km^{2}). The racial makeup of the city was 91.95% White, 1.48% African American, 0.60% Native American, 1.38% Asian, 0.30% Pacific Islander, 2.32% from other races, and 1.96% from two or more races. Hispanic or Latino of any race were 6.37% of the population.

There were 2,806 households, out of which 36.2% had children under the age of 18 living with them, 57.8% were married couples living together, 11.0% had a female householder with no husband present, and 27.1% were non-families. 22.3% of all households were made up of individuals, and 5.8% had someone living alone who was 65 years of age or older. The average household size was 2.73 and the average family size was 3.21.

In the city, the population was spread out, with 28.2% under the age of 18, 14.2% from 18 to 24, 28.2% from 25 to 44, 20.5% from 45 to 64, and 8.9% who were 65 years of age or older. The median age was 29 years. For every 100 females, there were 98.7 males. For every 100 females age 18 and over, there were 98.1 males.

The median income for a household in the city was $44,375, and the median income for a family was $49,453. Males had a median income of $32,389 versus $23,635 for females. The per capita income for the city was $18,627. About 6.9% of families and 8.8% of the population were below the poverty line, including 14.3% of those under age 18 and 1.2% of those age 65 or over.

== History ==
Once called "Stringtown" due to the early homes being strung along a single road and the Weber River, Riverdale was also known as "Jack Thompson's Settlement" and "Union" before the name of Riverdale was given to the town.

The first settlers in the community were James Graham, his sons George and Robert, and other members of the Graham family. They farmed in the area as early as 1850. Elisha Lane located nearby, as did William Farley, and Rufus Allen. Other early settlers of Riverdale included Adam Fife, Alexander Patterson, Warren Gould Child Sr, Thomas Slater, Richard Woolsey, John Child, John C. Thompson, William Stimpson, Myron Barber Child, Richard Dye, and George Ritter.

Daniel Burch built a grist mill along the eastern bank of the Weber River in 1853. John Taylor, an LDS apostle, purchased and expanded the mill in 1858. Other industries began establishing, including match manufacturing (by Hugh Findlay, who later served as the settlement's first teacher), a blacksmith shop, and a canning factory.

The town of Riverdale was finally incorporated on March 4, 1946.

== See also ==
- List of cities and towns in Utah
