= La Verkin, Utah =

City in Utah, United States

- City
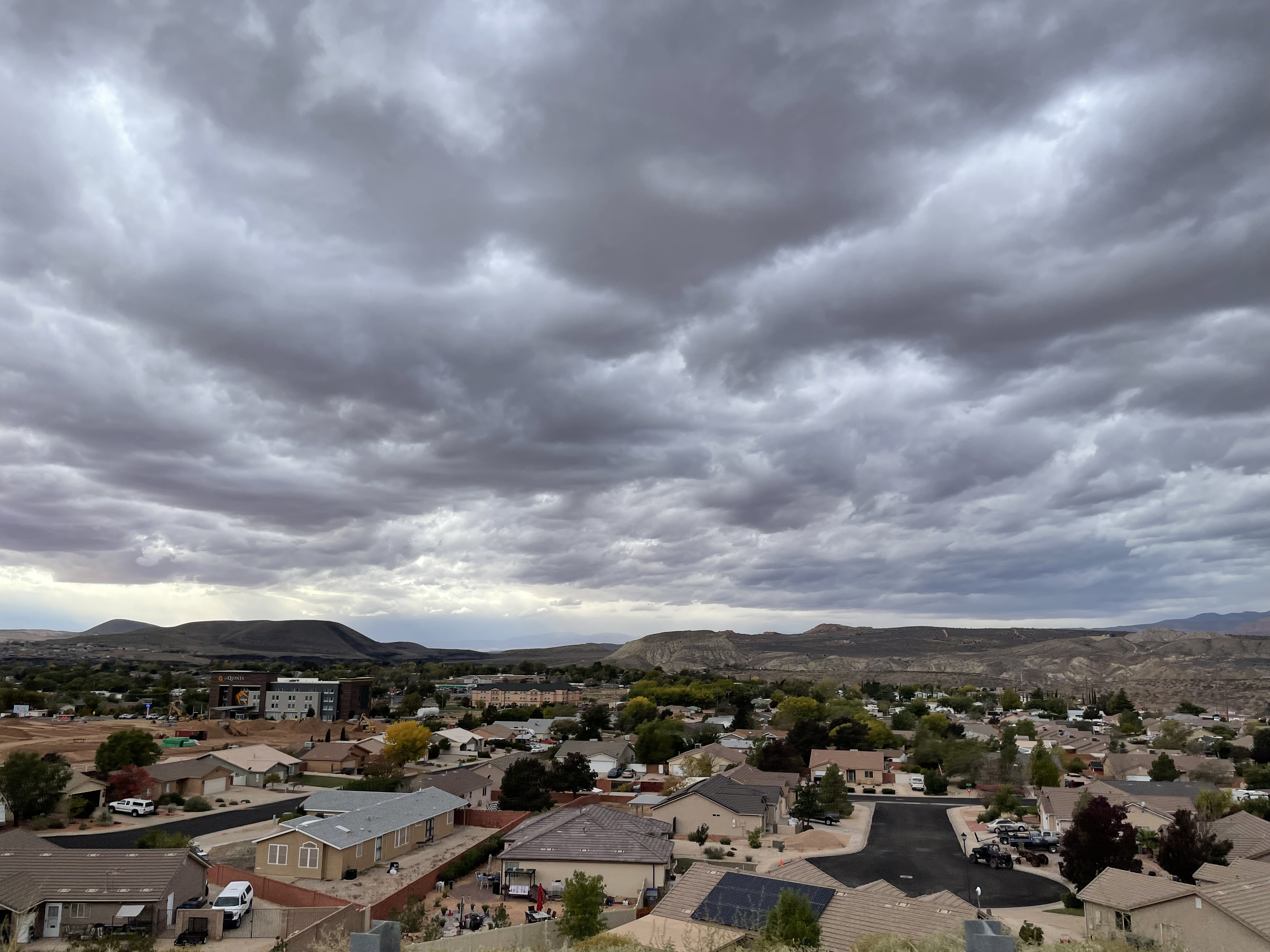
- La Verkin in 2023

- Location in Washington County and the state of Utah
- Coordinates: 37°14′40″N 113°15′0″W
- Country: United States
- State: Utah
- County: Washington
- Settled: 1897
- Incorporated: 1927
- Founder: Thomas Judd
- Named for: Spanish: La Virgen: 'The Virgin'

Area
  - Total: 12.78 sq mi (33.10 km^{2})
  - Land: 12.78 sq mi (33.10 km^{2})
  - Water: 0 sq mi (0.00 km^{2})
- Elevation: 3,816 ft (1,163 m)

Population (2020)
  - Total: 4,354
  - Density: 347.9/sq mi (134.31/km^{2})
- Time zone: UTC-7 (Mountain (MST))
  - Summer (DST): UTC-6 (MDT)
- ZIP code: 84745
- Area code: 435
- FIPS code: 49-43440
- GNIS feature ID: 2411583
- Website: Official website

La Verkin is a city in Washington County, Utah, United States. The population was 4,354 as of 2020, an increase from 4,060 in 2010.

== History ==
Theories about the origin of the city's name suggest that it may be a corruption of the Spanish la virgen, after the nearby Virgin River, or possibly an error in the transcription of the term "beaver skin."

The city made national headlines in 2001 when the City Council passed an ordinance declaring La Verkin a "United Nations-free zone".

== Geography ==
According to the United States Census Bureau, the city has a total area of 16.1 square miles (41.8 km^{2}), all land.

=== Climate ===
According to the Köppen Climate Classification system, La Verkin has a semi-arid climate, abbreviated "BSk" on climate maps.

Climate data for La Verkin, Utah
Month	Jan	Feb	Mar	Apr	May	Jun	Jul	Aug	Sep	Oct	Nov	Dec	Year
Record high °F (°C)	74 (23)	80 (27)	93 (34)	97 (36)	106 (41)	111 (44)	114 (46)	111 (44)	108 (42)	103 (39)	85 (29)	74 (23)	114 (46)
Mean daily maximum °F (°C)	52.2 (11.2)	57.1 (13.9)	65.5 (18.6)	72.8 (22.7)	82.5 (28.1)	93.5 (34.2)	98.3 (36.8)	96.4 (35.8)	89.3 (31.8)	75.9 (24.4)	61.6 (16.4)	50.8 (10.4)	74.7 (23.7)
Mean daily minimum °F (°C)	29.1 (−1.6)	33.3 (0.7)	39.8 (4.3)	44.2 (6.8)	52.2 (11.2)	60.9 (16.1)	67.6 (19.8)	67.2 (19.6)	59.3 (15.2)	47.2 (8.4)	34.8 (1.6)	28.1 (−2.2)	47.0 (8.3)
Record low °F (°C)	−2 (−19)	2 (−17)	10 (−12)	21 (−6)	23 (−5)	34 (1)	46 (8)	39 (4)	31 (−1)	17 (−8)	12 (−11)	1 (−17)	−2 (−19)
Average precipitation inches (mm)	1.43 (36)	1.81 (46)	1.43 (36)	0.77 (20)	0.46 (12)	0.20 (5.1)	0.61 (15)	0.96 (24)	0.93 (24)	0.99 (25)	0.86 (22)	1.19 (30)	11.64 (296)
Average snowfall inches (cm)	0.3 (0.76)	0.4 (1.0)	0.2 (0.51)	0 (0)	0 (0)	0 (0)	0 (0)	0 (0)	0 (0)	0 (0)	0 (0)	0.5 (1.3)	1.4 (3.6)
Source: NOAA

== Demographics ==
Historical population
Census	Pop.	Note	%±
1910	120		—
1920	173		44.2%
1930	236		36.4%
1940	349		47.9%
1950	387		10.9%
1960	365		−5.7%
1970	463		26.8%
1980	1,174		153.6%
1990	1,771		50.9%
2000	3,392		91.5%
2010	4,060		19.7%
2020	4,354		7.2%
U.S. Decennial Census

=== 2020 census ===
As of the 2020 census, La Verkin had a population of 4,354. The median age was 34.1 years, with 30.5% of residents under the age of 18 and 16.4% aged 65 or older. For every 100 females there were 103.6 males, and for every 100 females age 18 and over there were 99.9 males.

There were 1,377 households in La Verkin, of which 41.2% had children under the age of 18 living in them. Of all households, 62.3% were married-couple households, 13.7% were households with a male householder and no spouse or partner present, and 18.2% were households with a female householder and no spouse or partner present. About 17.3% of all households were made up of individuals and 10.1% had someone living alone who was 65 years of age or older. There were 1,559 housing units, of which 11.7% were vacant. The homeowner vacancy rate was 0.7% and the rental vacancy rate was 11.7%.

93.9% of residents lived in urban areas, while 6.1% lived in rural areas.

Racial composition as of the 2020 census
Race	Number	Percent
White	3,740	85.9%
Black or African American	11	0.3%
American Indian and Alaska Native	65	1.5%
Asian	21	0.5%
Native Hawaiian and Other Pacific Islander	28	0.6%
Some other race	177	4.1%
Two or more races	312	7.2%
Hispanic or Latino (of any race)	496	11.4%

=== 2000 census ===
As of the census of 2000, there were 3,392 people, 1,053 households, and 840 families residing in the city. The population density was 210.3 people per square mile (81.2/km^{2}). There were 1,158 housing units at an average density of 71.8 per square mile (27.7/km^{2}). The racial makeup of the city was 93.81% White, 0.12% African American, 1.27% Native American, 0.21% Asian, 0.12% Pacific Islander, 1.92% from other races, and 2.56% from two or more races. Hispanic or Latino of any race were 4.60% of the population.

There were 1,053 households, out of which 44.6% had children under the age of 18 living with them, 66.3% were married couples living together, 9.6% had a female householder with no husband present, and 20.2% were non-families. 17.0% of all households were made up of individuals, and 7.5% had someone living alone who was 65 years of age or older. The average household size was 3.20 and the average family size was 3.61.

In the city, the population was spread out, with 35.8% under the age of 18, 9.1% from 18 to 24, 24.5% from 25 to 44, 17.5% from 45 to 64, and 13.1% who were 65 years of age or older. The median age was 29 years. For every 100 females, there were 98.9 males. For every 100 females age 18 and over, there were 94.0 males.

The median income for a household in the city was $35,949, and the median income for a family was $39,432. Males had a median income of $30,051 versus $19,602 for females. The per capita income for the city was $12,113. About 10.1% of families and 12.1% of the population were below the poverty line, including 15.7% of those under age 18 and 6.4% of those age 65 or over.

== See also ==
- List of cities and towns in Utah
