= Town Square (St. George, Utah) =

Historic block in St. George, Utah, U.S.

Town Square Park
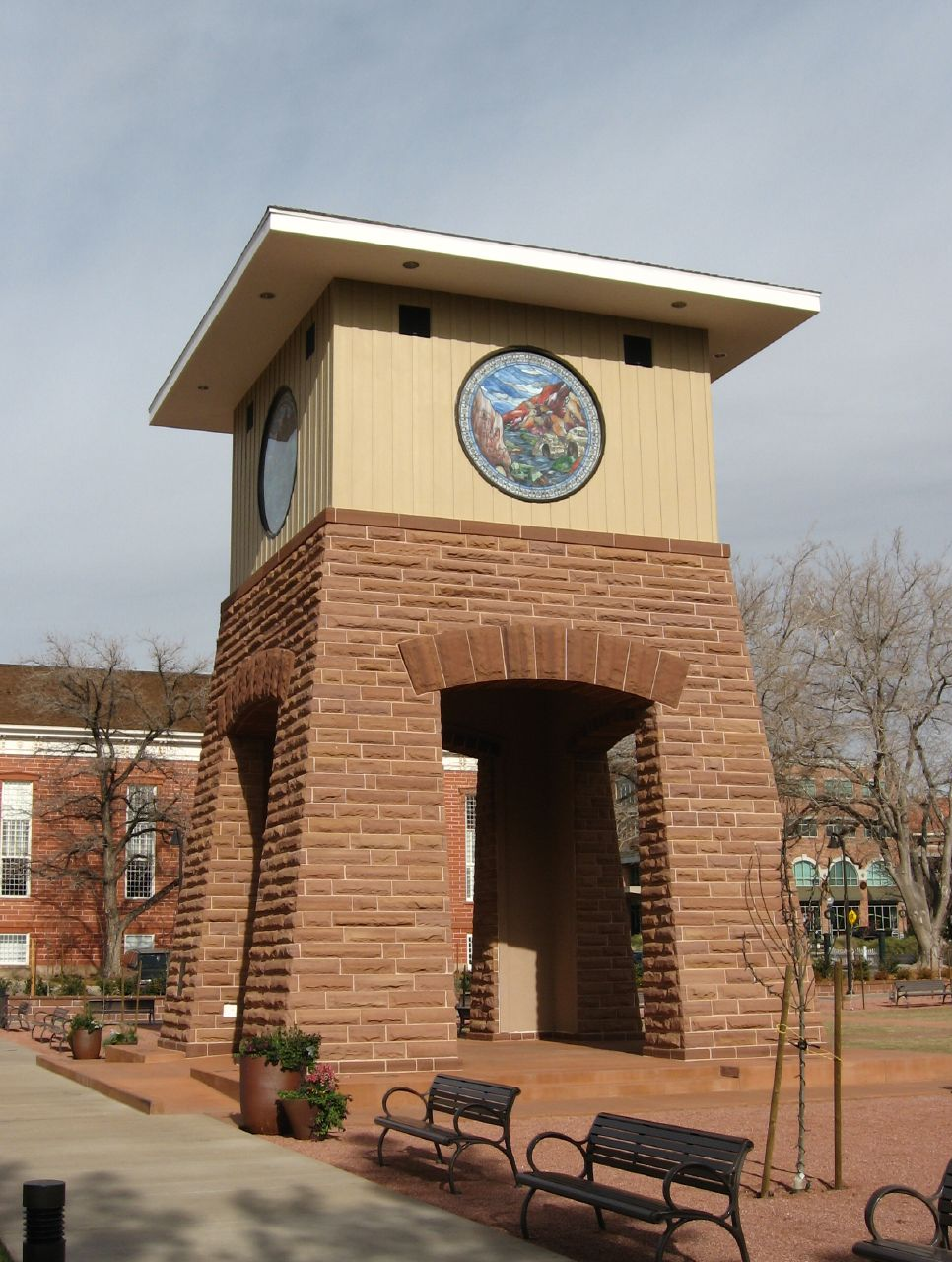
- Heritage Tower at Town Square
- Interactive map of Town Square Park
- Type: Municipal Park and Historic Site
- Location: St. George, Utah, United States
- Coordinates: 37°6′27″N 113°35′4″W
- Opened: October 15, 2007
- Operator: City of St. George
- Open: Year round

Town Square (historically known as the Public Square or Tabernacle Block) is a historic block in St. George, Utah. The block is known for its long-time connection with the religious and educational institutions of the community. In 2007, the City of St. George opened Town Square Park on the block, connecting the various historic buildings with public park space.

== Description ==
The city block is located in the downtown area of St. George. It is bounded by Main Street on the east, Tabernacle Street on the north, 100 West on the west, and 100 South on the south. The blocks in St. George contain an area of 6.4 acres (2.6 ha).

The creation of Town Square Park closed 100 West street and has turned the square into more of a rectangle.

== Historical usage ==
In December 1861, soon after the arrival of pioneer settlers to St. George, they constructed a bowery on the block. This bowery provided a sheltered meeting space for the community until about 1864, when a new one was constructed on the block to the north. A parcel of ground on the square, just south of the Woodward School, was known as the Parade Grounds and was a location where soldiers would drill. Those soldiers returning from active duty were also honored in ceremonies on the grounds by the community.

Much of the block had originally belonged to the City of St. George but over time the local school district and the Church of Jesus Christ of Latter-day Saints (LDS Church) acquired sections to build educational and religious buildings on. The city, in partnership with Washington County, purchased a significant portion of the square back from the LDS Church in February 1979. This was made up of the eastern half of the block, minus the St. George Tabernacle, and included the 1911 Academy Building, the college's 1916 gymnasium, and the LDS recreation hall. The gymnasium and recreation hall buildings were torn down in summer 1980, to make way for a new branch of the county library. After the six grade center at Woodward School was closed, the city then made another large purchase of land in 2000, which included the old Woodward gymnasium and parade grounds from the school district. The Woodward gymnasium was remodeled into a theater by the St. George Musical Theater group before being torn down a few years later during the creation of Town Square Park.

== Town Square Park ==
The City of St. George dedicated the newly built Town Square Park on October 15, 2007, with a prayer by LDS Church leader Steven E. Snow. (Note: Developed at the same time as Town Square Park, the city created a pocket park around Cox Pond at the north end of Main Street. This park, named the Brooks Nature Park, includes a stone amphitheater and trails, surrounding an early irrigation pond. To connect Brooks Nature Park with the downtown area and Town Square Park, the city also created the Water Walk, a wide walkway on the east side of Main Street which includes water features, vegetation, and historical plaques. The Water Walk was dedicated during the same ceremony as Town Square Park.) The park pays tribute to the heritage of the area and many of its features were constructed of sandstone to match the surrounding historic buildings. A 45-foot (14 m) tall "Heritage Tower" in the center of the park features four, 8-foot (2.4 m) high stained-glass windows. Known as the "Portholes of the Past" the windows depict significant events in the history of St. George. Other features include a splash pad, winding river, plantings of traditional pioneer crops, an amphitheater, and a grassy festival grounds. The creation of Town Square Park cost $1.5 million (equivalent to $2,329,080 in 2025).

=== Carousel ===
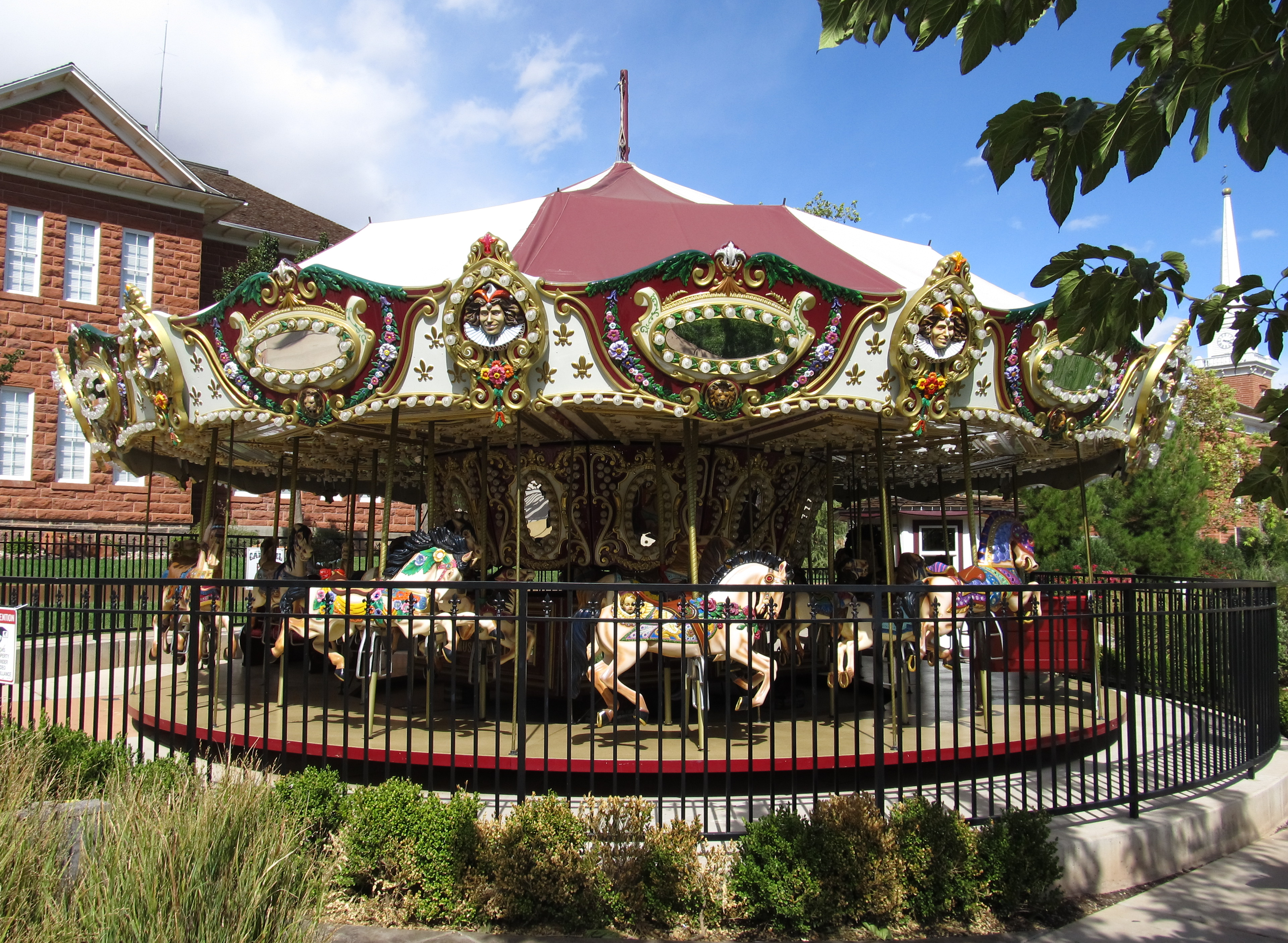
Carousel at Town Square

On July 4, 2011, the city opened a carousel in the park. The 36-foot (11 m) ride contains 30 hand-painted horses and two sleighs, having been originally built in 1989. The Chance Morgan Company ride was purchased by the City of St. George for $300,000 (equivalent to $429,364 in 2025) from the Hurlbut Amusement Company of California.

=== Art and monuments ===
The park contains a sculpture garden. In 2022, a statue of historian Juanita Brooks was added to the garden. A "Gold Star Families Memorial Monument" was also added to the park in 2022.

== Buildings ==
Town Square contains three historic buildings, plus a modern library, each placed on the four corners of the block.

=== St. George Tabernacle ===
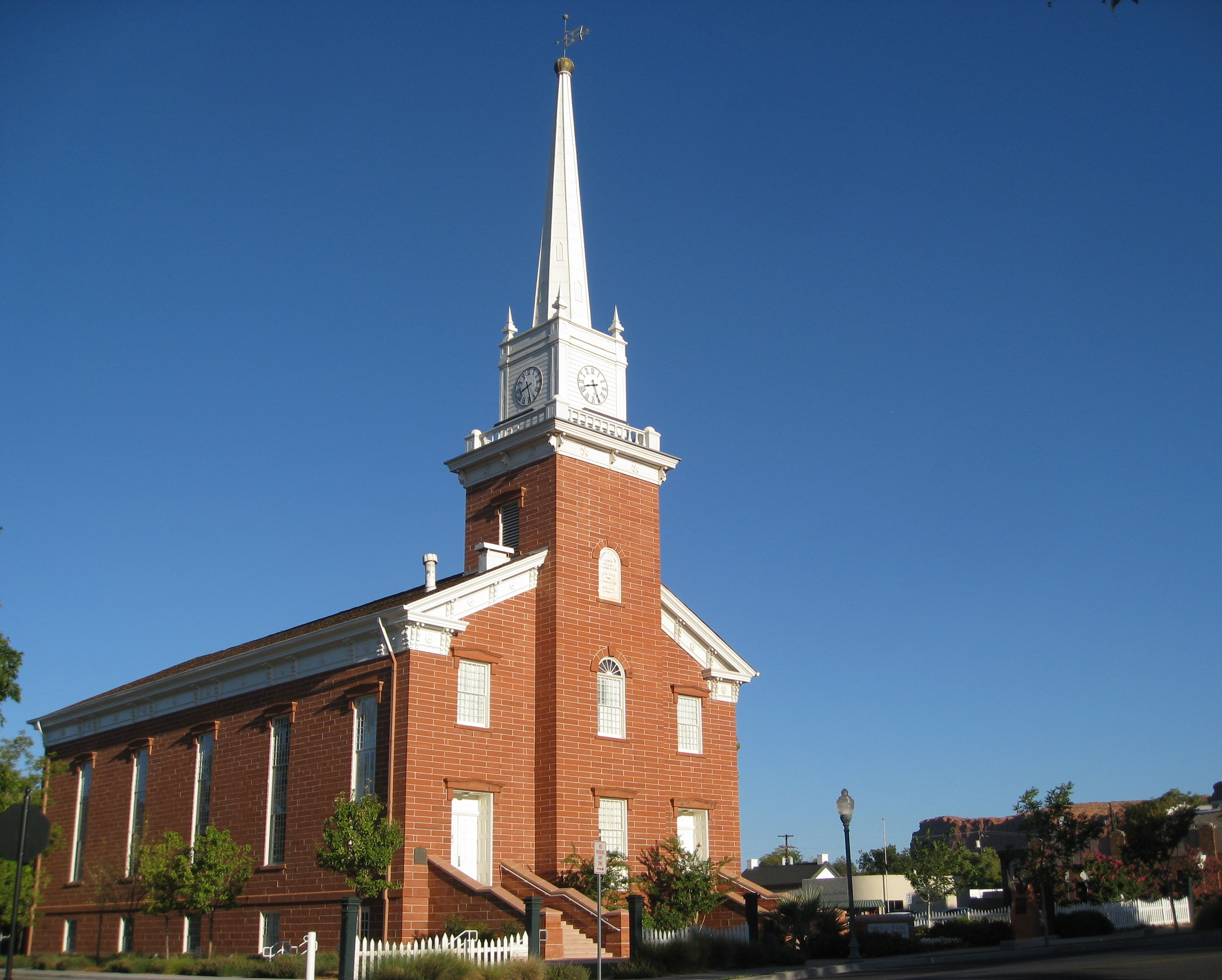
St. George Tabernacle

Located on the northeast corner of the block, the tabernacle was built by the LDS Church as meeting space for its members in the area. The first cornerstone was laid on June 1, 1863 and the building was dedicated by Brigham Young Jr. on May 14, 1876. Built of red sandstone, it includes a large meeting space on the main floor with a gallery level, and beneath is a basement level. At the east end is a 140-foot (43 m) tall tower with a clock and bell. The building has undergone several renovations to preserve, and where needed, restore, its historic appearance.

Besides being used for religious services, early in the community's history, school classes were also taught in the building.

=== Woodward School ===
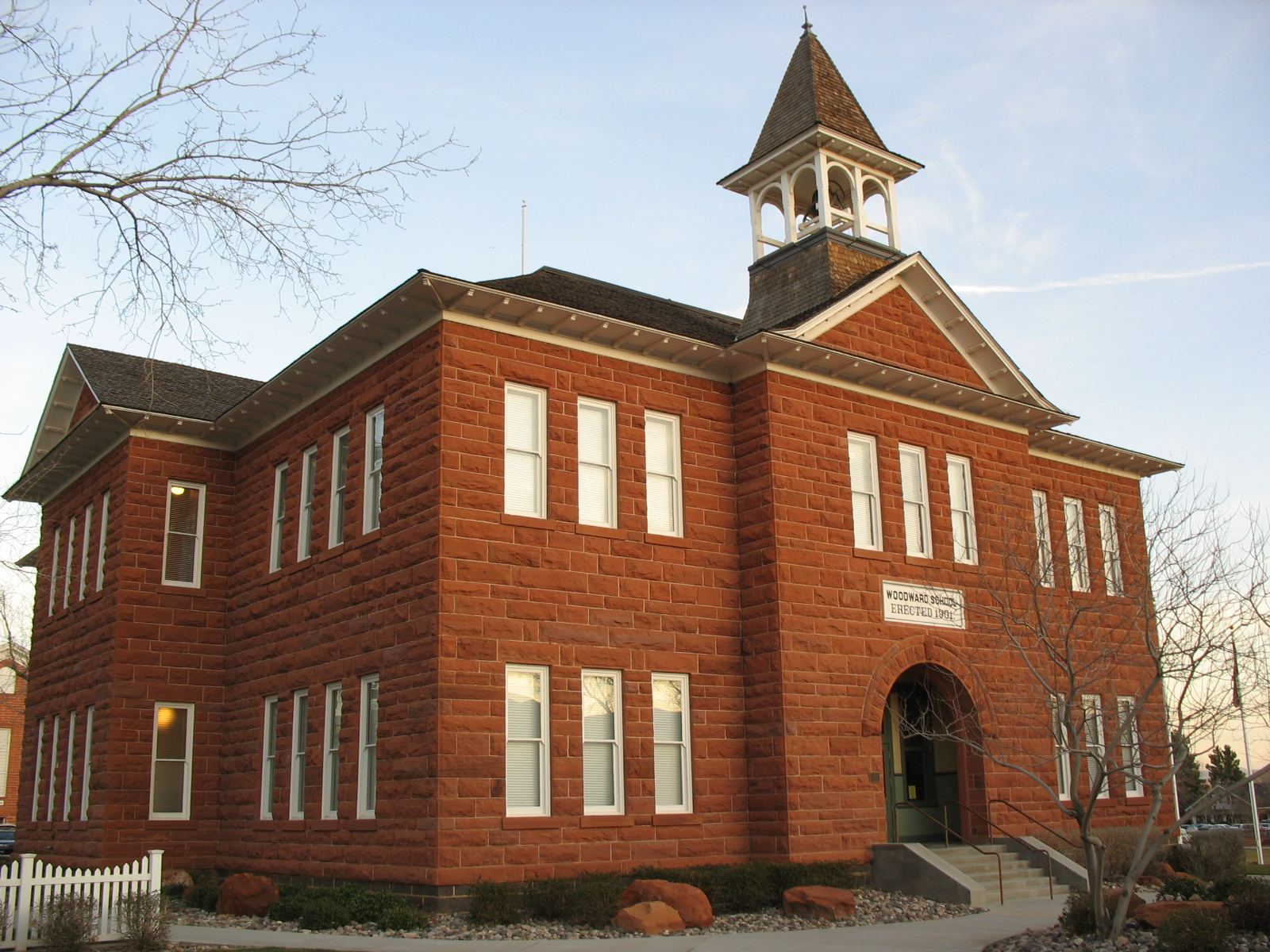
Woodward School

Opened in 1901, the Woodward School was St. George's first central public school building, bringing together students who had previously been scattered around the city in smaller ward schools. It is located on the northwest corner of Town Square. Until 1936, the school housed grades one through eight. After a new elementary school building was constructed across the street, it housed grades seven through ten, and was known as Woodward Junior High School (or sometimes just Woodward High School). After a new junior high was opened in 1977, the Woodward School became overflow space for elementary students, and from 1985 to 2000, was the location of the school district's six grade center. A restoration of the building was completed in 2004, following which the building has been used as an educators' center, with conference and training space for teachers.

=== Academy Building ===
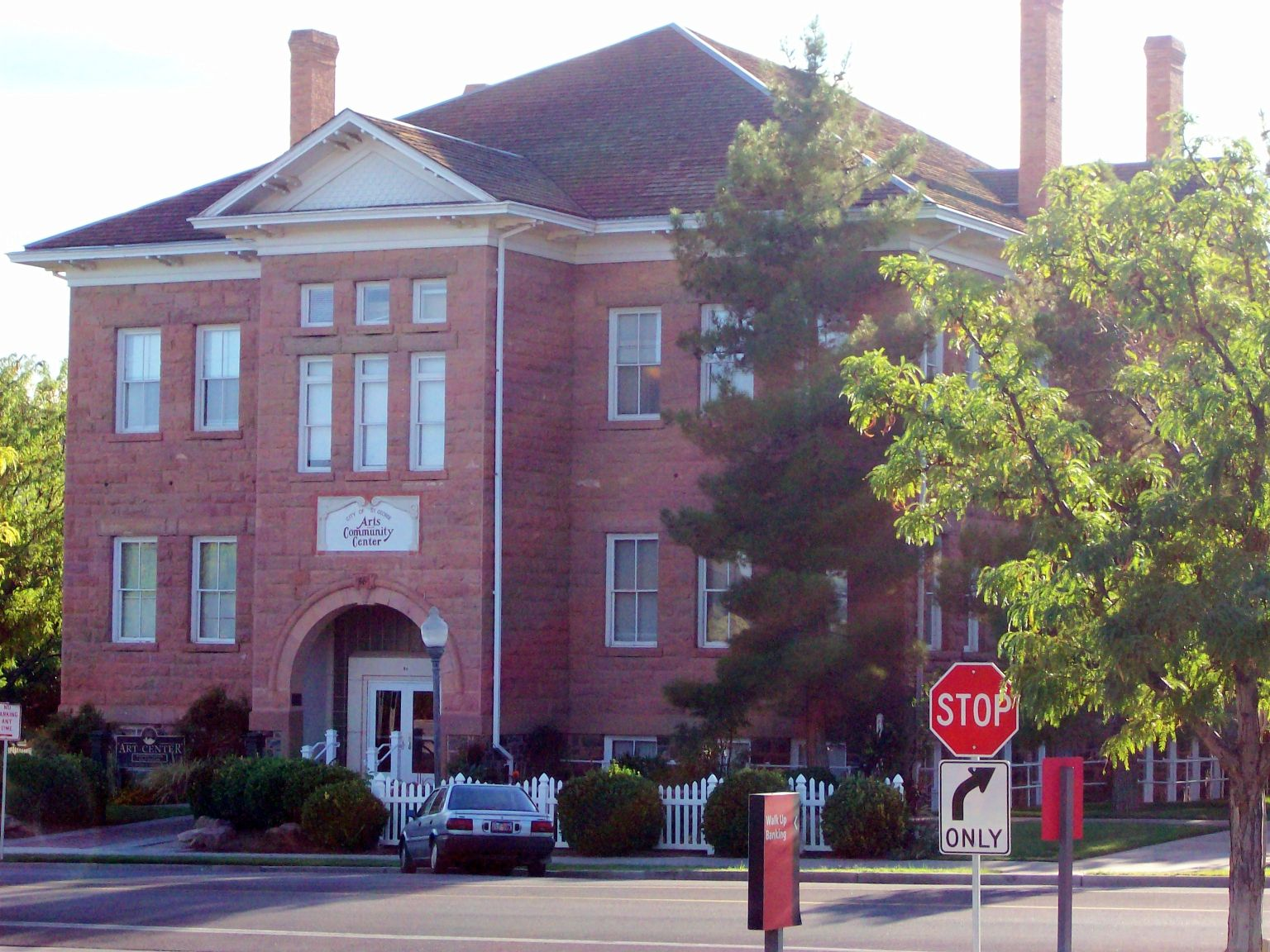
Academy Building, home to the St. George Children's Museum

Opened in September 1911, the building was constructed on the southeast corner of the square to house the St. George Stake Academy, a privately-run high school. The school eventually added college-level programs, and is the ancestor of both Dixie High School and Utah Tech University. The college moved out of the building and to a new campus in 1963, as did the high school in 1966.

In 1977, the Southwestern Utah Arts Council began leasing the building. The council renovated the building into a community arts center, with the former classrooms being used for lessons and art displays. The building was purchased by the City of St. George in 1979, along with much of the eastern half of Town Square. Renovations of the building began in 1982, and continued until the third-floor hall was restored in 2007.

The third-floor hall, known as the "Dixie Academy Ballroom at Town Square," is available as an event rental space for the community. The St. George Children's Museum, located on the lower and middle levels, opened on November 21, 2013.

=== County Library branch ===
The local library branch has been located on this block since shortly after the opening of the St. George Stake Academy in 1911, when the city moved their books into an upstairs room of the Academy Building. In June 1916, the library was moved to a newly constructed Carnegie library building between the Woodward School and St. George Tabernacle. This library was torn down in October 1981, after a new building was constructed between the St. George Tabernacle and the Academy Building. Opened in 1981, this library was then demolished in January 2007, in preparation for the construction of Town Square Park.

A new library building was opened in December 2006 and dedicated in February 2007. Located on the southwest corner of the square, at its opening, it contained more than 110,000 items, had 30,000 square feet (2,800 m^{2}) of space, and was faced with red sandstone to match the nearby historic buildings on the square.
