= Academy Building (St. George, Utah) =

Historic school building in St. George, Utah, U.S.

- Main Building of Dixie College
- U.S. National Register of Historic Places
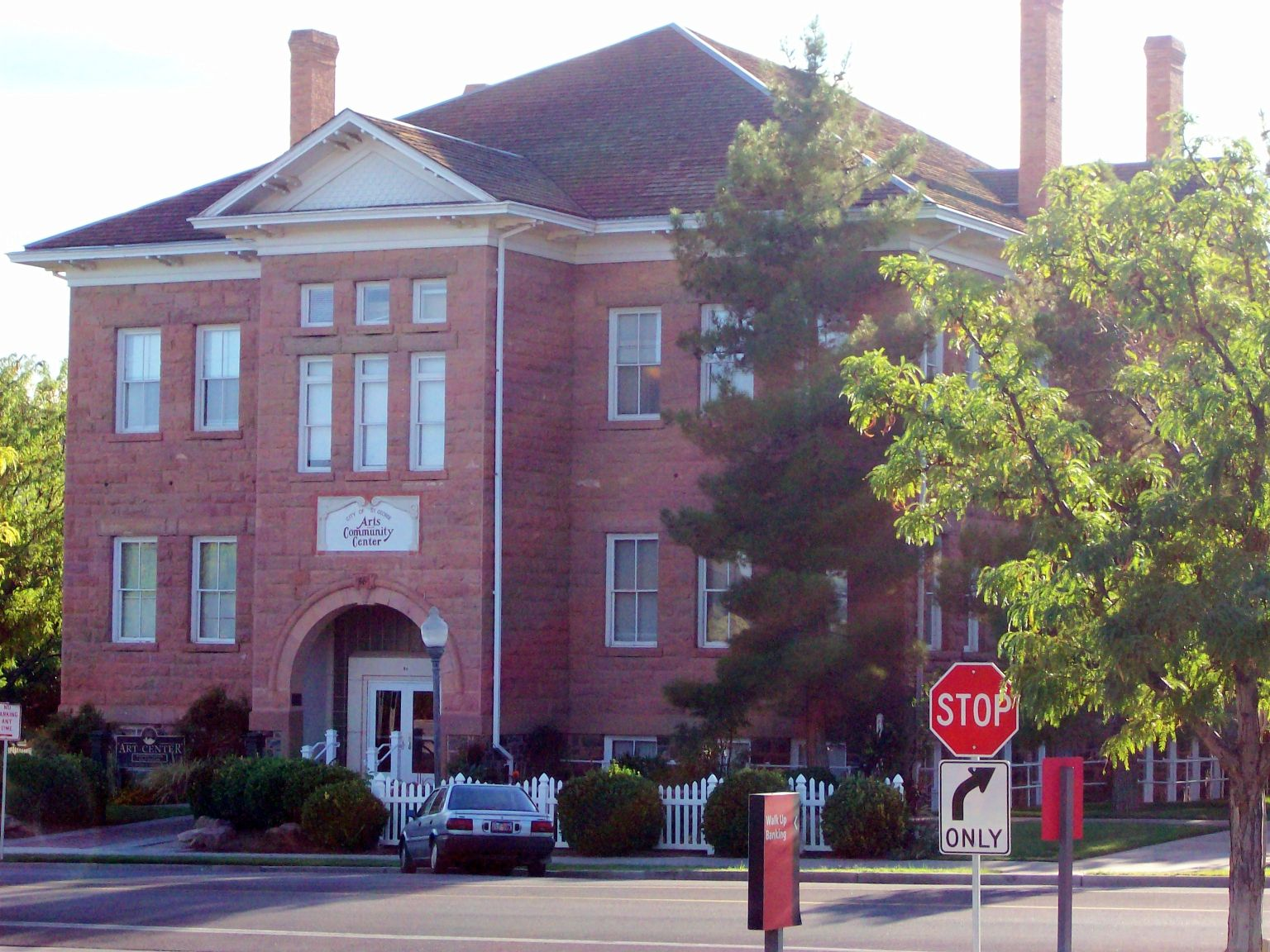
- Academy Building, circa 2010

- Location within Utah
- Location: 86 South Main Street; St. George, Utah, United States
- Coordinates: 37°6′24.7″N 113°35′1.3″W
- Built: 1909–1911
- Architect: Joseph Monson
- Architectural style: Richardsonian Romanesque
- NRHP reference No.: 80003988
- Added to NRHP: June 19, 1980

The Academy Building (also known as the Dixie Academy Building or the Main Building of Dixie College) is a historic school building on Town Square in St. George, Utah. Opened in September 1911, it was constructed to house the St. George Stake Academy, the first high school in St. George.

Over time, the academy incorporated Dixie into its name (a common nickname for the region) and began to offer college-level programs. As it evolved, the academy became the ancestor of two modern-day institutions: Dixie High School and Utah Tech University. Both schools moved out of the building in the 1960s, after which it was used as overflow for the nearby Woodward Junior High. It later became the St. George Community Arts Center and since 2013 has been home to the St. George Children's Museum.

Due to its historical significance, the structure was listed on the National Register of Historic Places (NRHP) in June 1980.

== St. George Stake/Dixie Academy ==
Primary schools were established in St. George soon after its settlement in 1861, holding their first classes in tents or other temporary structures. Four districts (based on the four LDS ward boundaries in the city) were established in 1863, after which were built the permanent schoolhouses. In 1871, a secondary school (high school) was opened in the Third Ward Schoolhouse, but it only lasted a single season. There were additional attempts in the 1870s and 1880s to create both secondary schools and normal schools (for the training of much needed teachers in the area), but none were successful until the St. George Stake Academy.

=== First stake academy (1888) ===
Wilford Woodruff, president of the Church of Jesus Christ of Latter-day Saints (LDS Church), created the General Church Board of Education in 1888, which implemented a program to establish academies (a form of secondary education in the 19th century) to be run by local LDS stakes. In June of that year, stake leaders in St. George established a stake board of education, which wrote to Woodruff, informing him of their plans for an academy in St. George and requested the name of someone who would make a good principal; Nephi M. Savage was suggested, and he accepted the position. The basement of the St. George Tabernacle was procured for the classes, while the stake worked to solicit donations to construct a building for the school on Town Square.

The academy's first term started on October 15, 1888. At its opening, there were 35 students enrolled with the number growing to 80 by the end of the first term, then to 131 by the end of the second term. The students came from across southern Utah and Nevada. In 1893, the church announced it was discontinuing subsidies to academies for the time being, in part due to the Panic of 1893, and the stake board of education decided to close the school. Stone had been quarried for a never-built academy building, which was later used in the foundation of St. George's Woodward School.

=== Second stake academy (1911) ===
In the following decades, the city's four school districts were consolidated into one, and the Woodward School was opened in 1901, bringing together students from across the city into one centralized school building. Soon after the opening of Woodward School, grades nine and ten would be added, offering some secondary education in the area. However, the citizens desired a full, four-year high school for their children. In 1907, stake leaders felt it was an opportune time try and establish an academy again. The stake began to seek donations to construct a school building, while the LDS Church's leadership in Salt Lake City expressed its support for the renewed effort. Ground for a building was broken in October 1909 and the school opened to students in September 1911. (Note: The stake published announcements that the academy would open on September 19, 1911. The Washington County News published that the opening exercises were held September 29, 1911.) As a private school, tuition was initially set at $15 a year (equivalent to $518 in 2025). At its opening, grades 9-10 were moved over from the Woodward School and grade 11 added; the following year grade 12 was added and the Class of 1913 became the institution's first graduating class. In 1916, a normal college was established in the school, with the students using nearby Woodward School to do their teaching training/practice. The school's name was changed to Dixie Normal College to reflect the new educational offerings. By 1920, besides the high school program, the institution offered four divisions of higher education: the Normal School, Junior College of Arts and Sciences, Night Classes, and an Extension Division (for correspondence courses in agriculture and home economics). The school became known simply as Dixie College in 1923.

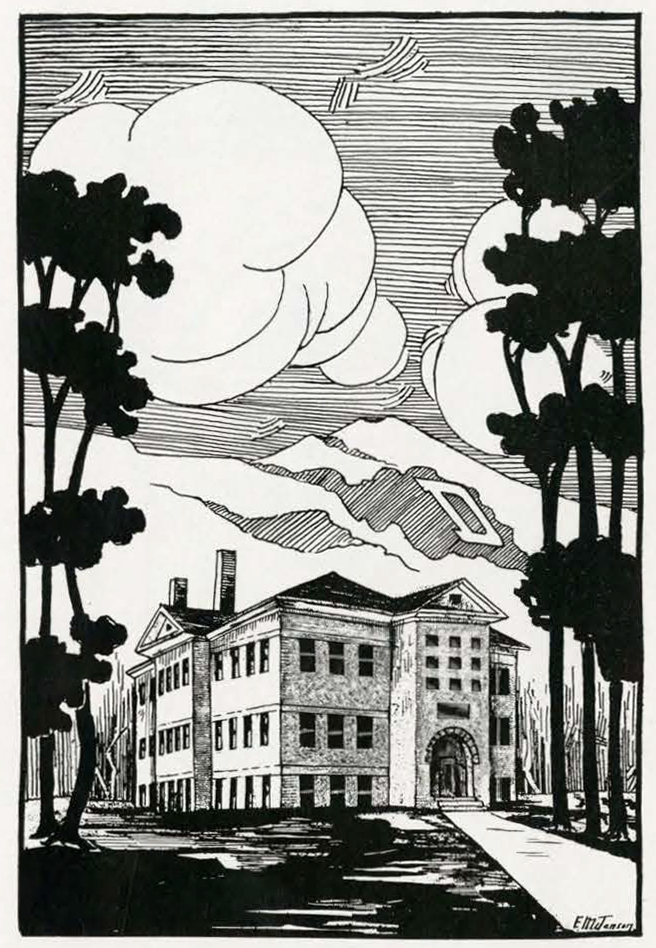
An illustration featuring the academy building from the school's 1924 yearbook

Even with collecting tuition, it was necessary for the LDS Church to provide money for maintenance of the buildings and salaries of the teachers, and local donations also contributed to keeping the school open. The post-war recession of the early 1920s, put a strain on the LDS Church's academy system and several were closed. As the church moved towards favoring its seminaries and institutes program over operating entire schools, and economic pressures of the Great Depression weighed on the church, it decided to dispose of Dixie College. Initially, the church planned to give the school to the Washington County School District which would transition it to a public high school, doing away with the college courses (while giving two other church schools—Weber College and Snow College—to the state to continue to run as colleges). Desiring to maintain the college, leaders in St. George began to petition the state legislature to take over the school and maintain its college status. This was initially done in direct opposition to Joseph F. Merrill, the Commissioner of Church Education. The legislature passed a bill in 1933 to accept control of the school, however Utah's governor Henry H. Blood vetoed the legislation, not wanting to increase the state budget. The governor only agreed to sign the bill once it was amended (and passed again by the legislature) to remove any appropriation of funds for the college's first two years under state control. As such, donations from the LDS Church and community kept the school operating during these two years.

Following the construction of new elementary school building in 1936, the school district implemented, in cooperation with the college, a 6-4-4 plan for the public schools in St. George. This would include six years of school in the new elementary building (grades 1-6), the establishment of a junior high in the Woodward School with four grades (7–10), and four years in the Academy Building (grades 11-12, plus two years of college). An agreement between the state and school district provided for the district to pay a "rental fee" for the upper high school grades to be part of the college campus. (Note: A report from President B. Glen Smith described the relationship between the high school and college as: "From all external appearances the institution is a four-year junior college, and it is administered as such. Legally, however, the upper two years is under the jurisdiction of the State of Utah, and the lower two years is under the supervision of the Washington County school district. The two agencies cooperate to the extent of a complete, unified organization. An adequate rental is paid to the college by the County board of education." Classes between the college students and high school students were kept separate, unless the State Board of Education had approved combining them.)

The state had early on wanted the high school and college to separate, but owing to the Great Depression and effects of World War II, did not press the issue. By the early 1950s, the situation had changed and 32 acres (13 ha), just east of town, were purchased for a new college campus. In May 1956, a groundbreaking ceremony was held for the first building constructed on the new college campus – the gymnasium. After several years of planning and construction, the college officially moved to its new campus in September 1963. The high school, completely separated from the college starting in August 1963, remained in the old Academy Building until its new campus was built on 700 East street.

== Building description ==
The building includes three floors. The foundation rests on concrete piers, 4 feet (1.2 m) wide and 2 feet (0.61 m) deep. The walls of the basement level are constructed of black volcanic rock with cement mortar. The stones for the upper levels were quarried near Washington, Utah and are a pink Chinle sandstone, which stands in contrast to the red sandstone used for nearby historic buildings. The symmetrical, hipped roof building includes an arched entrance with a tablet, the original carved by George Brooks. The structure's style is a derivation of Richardsonian Romanesque, and the design is likened to two other nearby school buildings, the Woodward School and Washington School. Both the Academy Building and Woodward School were designed by Joseph Monson of Cache Valley.

== Building history ==
Construction of the building started with a groundbreaking at the end of October 1909. (Note: The exact date has been given as October 30, by author Edna J. Gregerson and as October 31 in later news reports.) The excavation for the foundation was completed later that year, with the placement of stones beginning soon after. However, owing to the mostly volunteer nature of its construction, progress on the building went slowly. Construction materials, such as cement and 36,000 pounds (16,000 kg) of steel, had to be hauled from the nearest railroad station in Modena, Utah to St. George.

In September 1911, just prior to the school's opening, a series of dances were held to celebrate. When classes began, only the lower-level classrooms and the upper-level hall had been completed, with workmen rushing to finish the middle level. The completed building cost $55,000 (equivalent to $1,900,446 in 2025), $20,000 of which was provided by the LDS Church and $35,000 was contributed by the local communities. A dedication for the building, with a prayer given by LDS Church president Joseph F. Smith, was held on September 14, 1913.

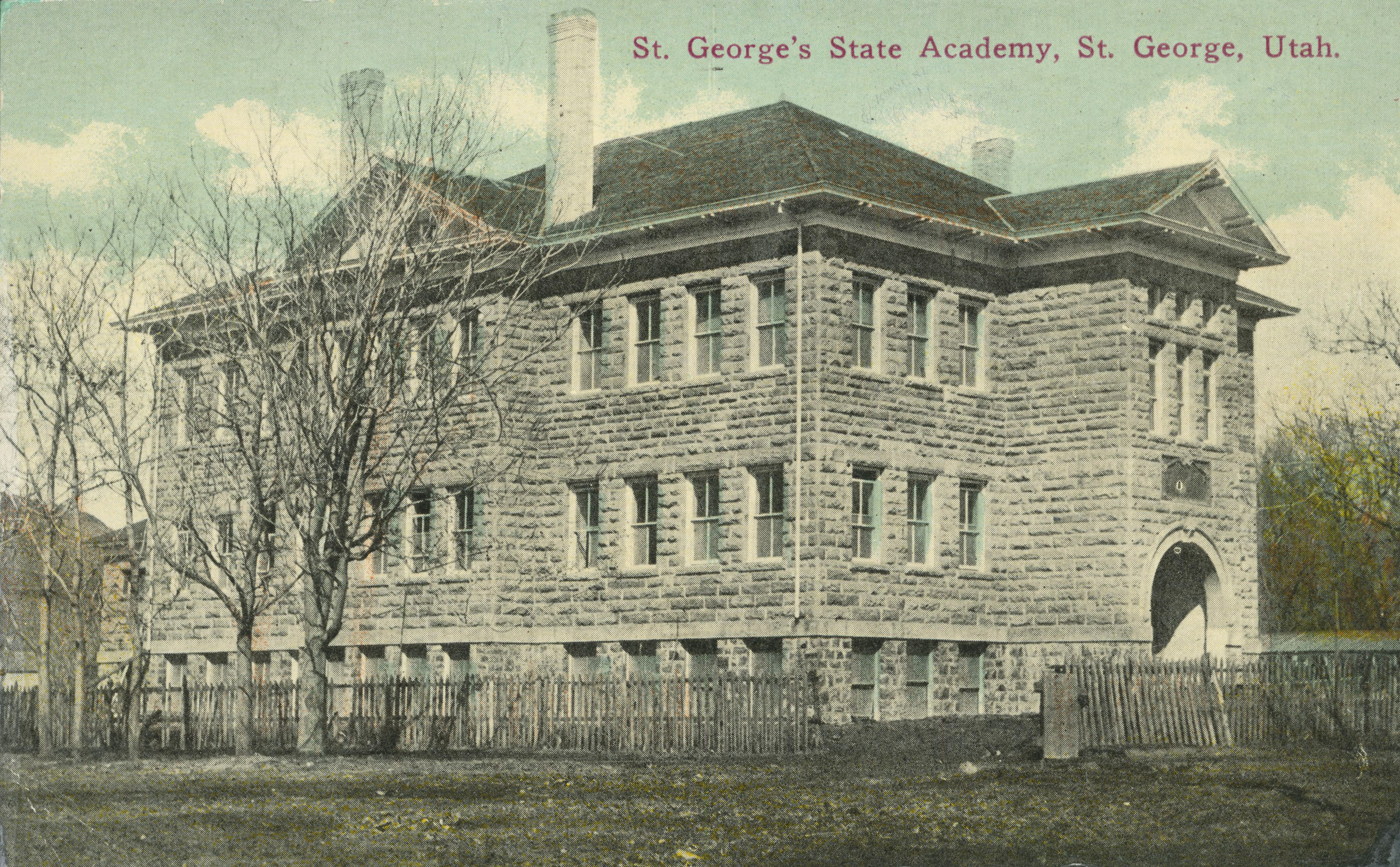
The St. George Stake Academy building soon after its completion

When the college was given to the state, the Academy Building was also deeded over, but with the stipulation it always be used for the college, otherwise it would revert back to the LDS Church. The college moved out of the building and to a new campus in 1963, and the high school moved to their own new campus in 1966.

After the high school moved out, the Academy Building was used as overflow space by the Woodward Junior High, until that school moved to a new campus at the end of 1976. The building was then turned back over to the LDS Church, per the district's lease contract. However, the stake president indicated that the church would not be able to maintain the building unless it was being used for a practical purpose.

In 1977, the Southwestern Utah Arts Council began leasing the building. The council began to renovate the building into a community arts center, with the classrooms being used for lessons and art displays. The Arts Council also offered use of the third-floor hall to the newly formed Washington County Community Theatre group. Then, in 1979, the city (in partnership with Washington County) purchased a significant portion of Town Square from the LDS Church. This was made up of the eastern half of the block, minus the St. George Tabernacle, and included the Academy Building, the college's 1916 gymnasium, and the LDS recreation hall. The gymnasium and recreation hall buildings were torn down in summer 1980, to make way for a new branch of the county library.

After the city acquired the Academy Building, the city council established the St. George Art Center Development Committee and tasked them to organize and solicit support for a renovation of the structure. Restoration work got underway in 1982, with new electrical and HVAC systems. Following the renovations of the 1980s, the building's third-floor hall went unused, due to the lack of an elevator. However, the city continued the restoration of the building in the form of small projects over the decades. By the early 2000s, the building had also become known as the "Leisure Services Building" and the city was looking at how to restore the third floor. In 2005, an addition to the northwest corner added an elevator, and beginning 2007, the third floor was restored back to near its original appearance. The third floor is available as an event rental space for the community, and, since 2024, is known as the "Dixie Academy Ballroom at Town Square."

In 2013, the City of St. George announced that a new children's museum would move into the historic building. The St. George Children's Museum, located on the lower and middle levels of the building, opened on November 21, 2013.

In 2026, the city rehabilited the structure's roof, which included demolishing the original full-height chimneys and replacing them with brick stubs.

== See also ==
- National Register of Historic Places listings in Washington County, Utah

== Bibliography ==
- Alder, Douglas D. (2010). A Century of Dixie State College of Utah. St. George, Utah: Dixie State College of Utah. ISBN 978-0-615-40669-5. OL 61507479M.
- Gregerson, Edna J. (1993). Dixie College: Monument to the Industry of a Dedicated People. Salt Lake City: Franklin Quest Co. OL 61507370M.
- Jones, Heber C. (2000). History of the Woodward School: 99 Years - 1901–2000 (PDF). St. George, Utah: The Committee for the Restoration of the Woodward School.
