= Woodward School (Utah) =

Historic school building in St. George, Utah, U.S.

- U.S. National Register of Historic Places
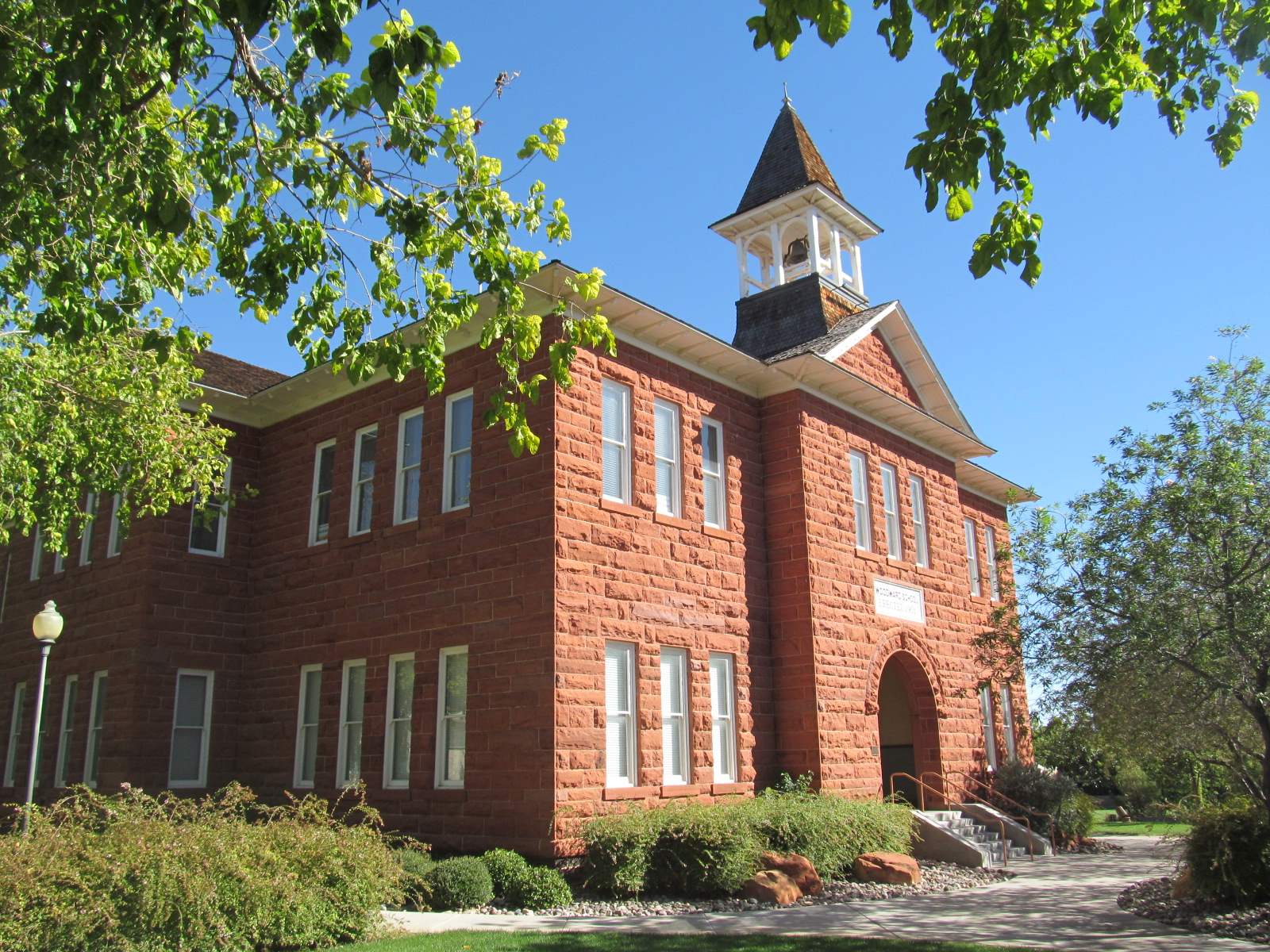
- Woodward School building
- Location: St. George, Utah, United States
- Coordinates: 37°6′28.4″N 113°35′6.4″W
- Built: 1897–1901
- Architectural style: Richardsonian Romanesque
- NRHP reference No.: 80003989
- Added to NRHP: November 23, 1980

The Woodward School is a historic school building on Town Square in St. George, Utah. Built from 1897 to 1901, it was the city's first centralized public school building, bringing together students from the older, smaller schools around the city.

The school building housed both elementary and intermediate-aged students until 1936, when a new elementary school building was constructed across the street. Afterwards, it became known as Woodward Junior High School until a new junior high opened in 1977. The historic structure has since been used by the local school district in a number of capacities, including as overflow for nearby schools. Since 2020, it has housed Southwest Adult High School.

The structure was listed on the National Register of Historic Places in 1980 and underwent a major restoration completed in 2004.

== Description ==
The building is a two-story structure, built of rough-faced red sandstone. The foundation is of volcanic stone which was quarried several years prior to the construction of the Woodward School, as it was meant for a never-built St. George Stake Academy building. The façade includes windows arranged in groups of three and four, and topping the main entrance is a bell tower. The structure's style is heavily influenced by late Victorian designs, most especially the Richardsonian Romanesque style. Its design is likened to two other nearby school buildings, the Washington School and Academy Building.

== History ==
St. George was founded in 1861, by members of the Church of Jesus Christ of Latter-day Saints (LDS Church) who organized their congregations into groups called wards, of which there were four in early St. George. When the settlers first arrived in the area, school classes were held in tents or temporary willow buildings, but in time the four wards developed their own primary-level schools. This practice of Mormon-run ward schools was common in the Utah Territory, and many would eventually evolve into district public schools supported by tax payers. The 1890 Free Public School Act passed by the Territorial Legislature further established public secular schools as the mainstream in Utah.

After the act passed, the four St. George ward school districts were consolidated into one, encompassing the whole city. The school buildings at the time were too small to accommodate the students, leading to the citizens approving taxes to build a new centralized school building, which would become the Woodward School. Work commenced on the building in September 1897, and due to the softness of the soil, a pile driver had to be used to pound gravel and small rock into the ground, prior to the foundation being laid. The school would be named for George Woodward, a local philanthropist, who provided money for the school's foundation, heating plant, and a piano.

The completed school opened in September 1901, housing grades one through eight; grades nine and ten would be added later. Ten years later, the St. George Stake Academy was opened on the same block, and grades nine and ten were moved there. The Woodward School functioned with these grades until 1936, when a new elementary school building was constructed across the street. The construction of this school brought major changes to the organization of public schools in the area, with the Washington County School District opting to establish a 6-4-4 plan. This would include six years of school in the new elementary building (grades 1-6), the establishment of Dixie Junior High in the Woodward School with four grades (7–10), and four years in the Academy Building (grades 11-12, plus two years of college).

=== Junior high ===
The newly established Dixie Junior High opened in the Woodward School building in September 1936. The school adopted the name "Woodward High School" in November 1938, as half of its students were of high school grade level. At various times, the school was also called Woodward Junior High and Woodward Junior-Senior High School.

In 1939, a new building containing a gymnasium, and space for home economics and industrial arts was constructed just south of the school building, with funds from the Public Works Administration (a New Deal program). In 1955, East Elementary and West Elementary were opened and the old elementary building was turned over to Woodward Junior-Senior High School, and was referred to as the Annex Building.

Woodward Junior High students began using a newly constructed building, located just southwest of Dixie High School, when they returned to classes from Christmas break in January 1977. Students had helped move equipment and supplies from the old Woodward School to their new building, just prior to leaving for the holidays.

=== Sixth grade center ===
After the junior high moved out, the Woodward building continued to be used by the school district as overflow space for students. By now the school and its surrounding buildings (the old gymnasium and annex) had become known as the "Woodward School Complex." Due to significant population growth in the area, it was decided to remodel the Woodward complex into a "Sixth Grade Center" and move six grade classes from the middle school to the center. Following a $100,000 (equivalent to $299,350 in 2025) renovation of the complex, the center opened in August 1985. In December 1997, the school district decided to close the sixth grade center at the Woodward Complex, due to the aging buildings. The center was closed at the conclusion of the school year in May 2000, with teachers being moved to the newly constructed Desert Hills Intermediate School.

While being used as the sixth grade center, the building's bell, which had been missing its clapper for many years, was restored. The repaired bell was rung on January 4, 1996, during centennial celebrations of Utah's statehood.

=== Restoration and later usage ===
Following its vote to close the school, the school board established the 15-member Woodward Community Committee, chaired by Scott Hirschi, to investigate possible future uses for the school complex. The committee established during its first meeting in February 1998 that the historic 1901 Woodward School building should be preserved and that its 8-acre (3.2 ha) campus should remain public open space. Shortly after that meeting, the committee toured the three-building complex and determined that the Woodward building was in the best condition of the three, with the gymnasium having been damaged in the 1992 St. George earthquake, and the Annex Building (originally the St. George Elementary School) displaying cracks in a beam and suffering flooding during rainstorms.

In August 1998, the committee presented the options it had developed to the school board. Two plans were offered, both of which preserved the Woodward School and kept it in public ownership. Soon after, another committee (under the management of the Foundation for Students of Washington County), was formed to work on the Woodward School's restoration. As for the other two buildings making up the Woodward School Complex, the Annex Building was torn down in April 2001 to make room for a new school district office building, and the gymnasium was remodeled into a theater by the St. George Musical Theater group before being torn down a few years later during the creation of Town Square Park.

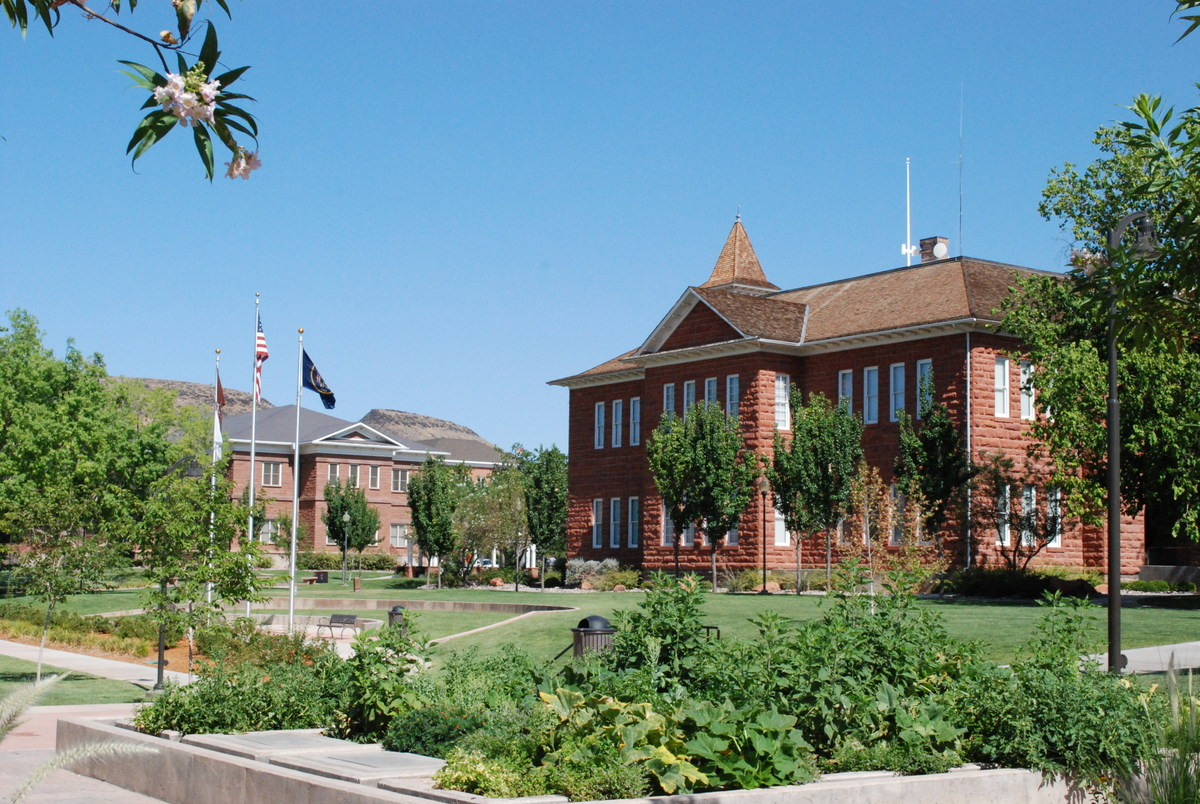
Woodward School, with the Washington County School District office building in the background

The Woodward Restoration Committee began fundraising efforts for the restoration in April 2000, and by that November, $500,000 (equivalent to $934,783 in 2025) had been collected. Remodeling work on the building had begun by at least December 2002. The renovation cost roughly $1.5 million (equivalent to $2,556,818 in 2025) and included refurbishing original floors, adding insulation, and new HVAC systems. The building was rededicated by Jeffrey R. Holland in a ceremony on March 26, 2004 at the nearby St. George Tabernacle. Included in the ceremony was the cutting of a blue ribbon and the ringing of the school bell, which had a new installed clapper.

Since the renovation, the building has served as a community and educators' center, with rooms for different community organizations, a school district media center, computer training center, and reading recovery room. Along with conference and training space for teachers. Beginning with the 2020–2021 school year, Southwest Adult High School began to utilize space in the building.

== See also ==
- National Register of Historic Places listings in Washington County, Utah

== Bibliography ==
- Jones, Heber C. (2000). History of the Woodward School: 99 Years - 1901–2000 (PDF). St. George, Utah: The Committee for the Restoration of the Woodward School.
