= St. George Elementary School =

St. George Elementary School may refer to:

- St. George Elementary School, a former historic school building in St. George, Utah, USA
- St. George Elementary School, a school in Ottawa, Ontario, Canada
- St. George Elementary School, a school in St. George, New Brunswick, Canada
- St. George Elementary School, a school in Tucker County, West Virigina
