= Woodward School =

Woodward School may refer to:

- Woodward Academy, a private school with two campuses in Georgia, United States
- Woodward High School, a school in Cincinnati, Ohio, United States
- Woodward School, a historic school building in St. George, Utah, United States
- Woodward School for Girls, a school in Quincy, Massachusetts, United States
