= St. George Tabernacle =

Historic church in Utah, United States

- U.S. National Register of Historic Places
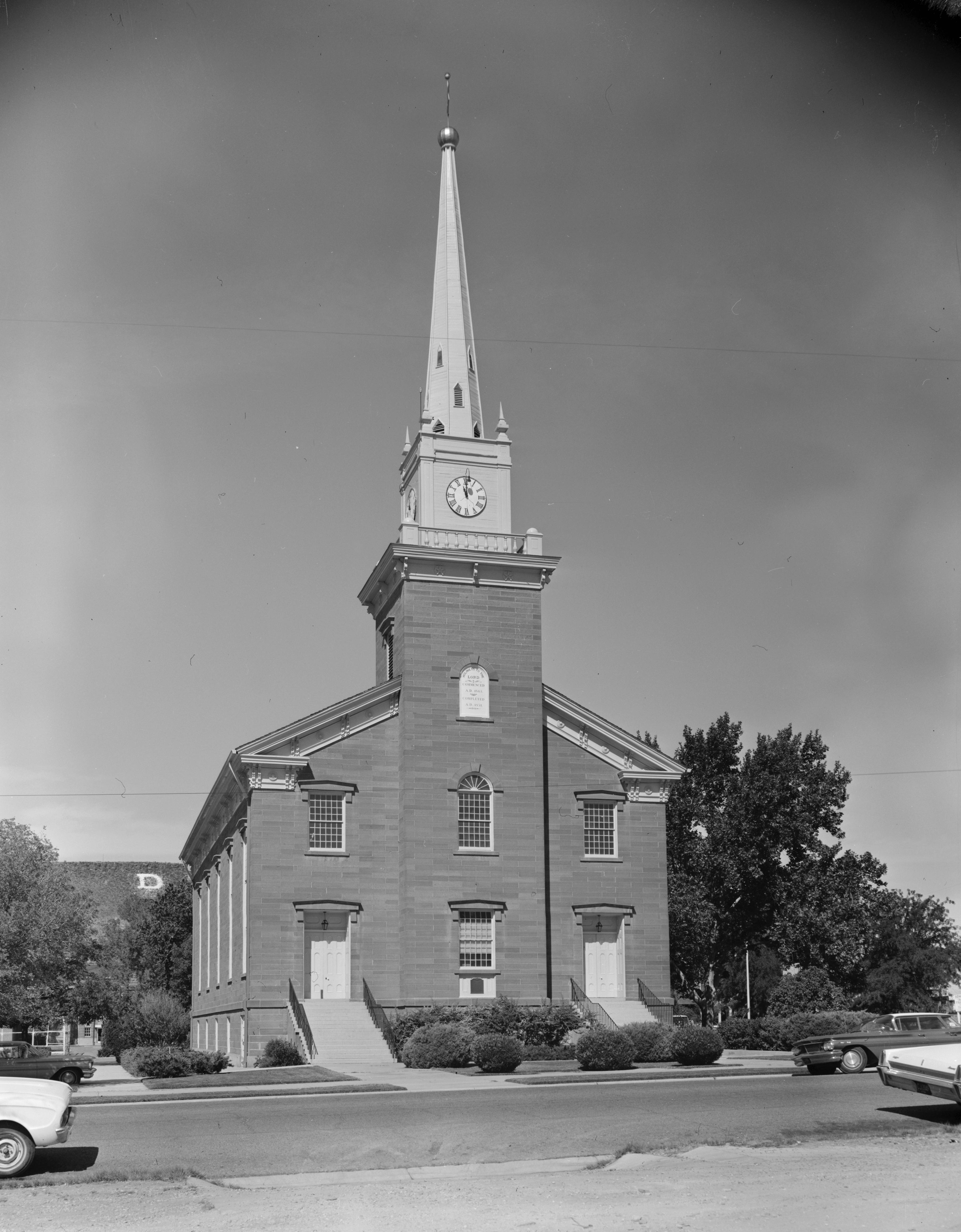

- Location within Utah Location within the United States
- Location: Junction of Tabernacle and Main Sts., St. George, Utah
- Coordinates: 37°6′29″N 113°34′58″W
- Built: 1876
- Architect: Miles Romney
- NRHP reference No.: 71000862
- Added to NRHP: May 14, 1971

The St. George Tabernacle is a historic building on Town Square in St. George, Utah. It opened in 1876 to serve as a public works building, originally hosting church services and court hearings. Today, it is open to the public and hosts many public events, such as concerts.

== History ==
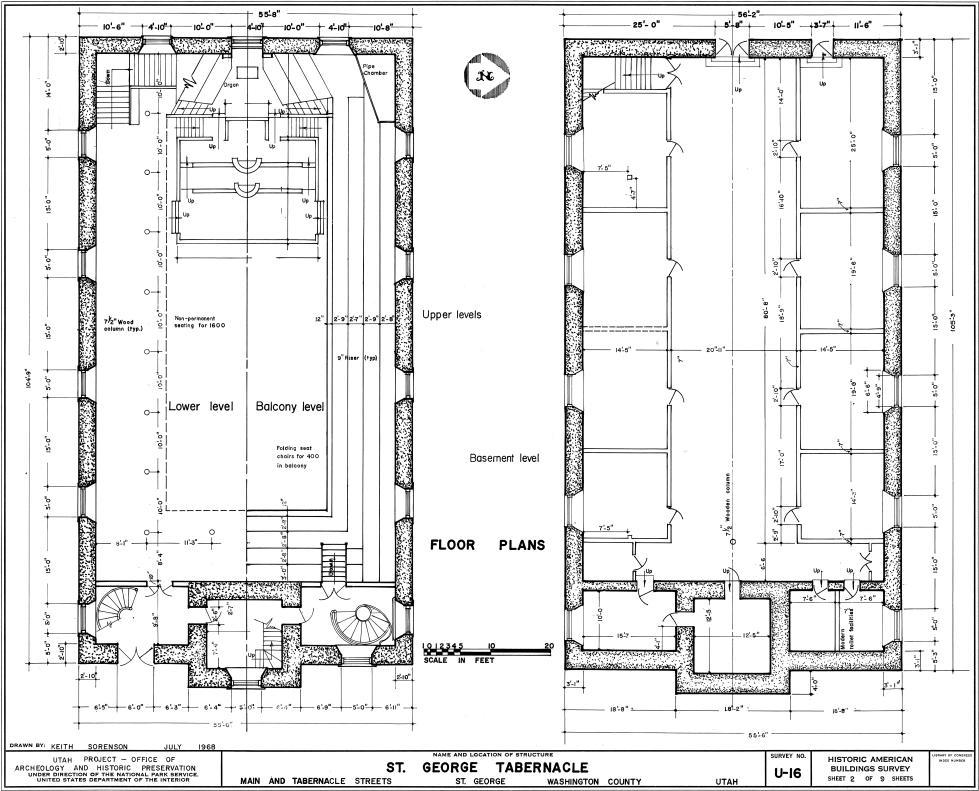
Floor plan of the St. George Tabernacle.

The settlement of St. George, Utah Territory was seen to be an important site for the future of the Church of Jesus Christ of Latter-day Saints. It was intended to be a cotton-growing town to allow the members of the church to be self-sufficient. The arid climate of Utah's Dixie resulted in poor harvests, resulting in economic hardship. Brigham Young, the President of the church at the time, then commissioned the construction of public works buildings in the area to assist the farmers.

The tabernacle was intended to work as a church and a courthouse. Funds for the building were raised by diverting all tithes from Beaver and all communities southward. Construction began on June 1, 1863. The building was opened on May 14, 1876, with a dedication ceremony featuring Brigham Young, Jr.

Miles Romney, a member of the Romney family, created the plans for the building. The main clock and bell tower stands 140 feet (43 m) tall. Basement walls were 3 feet (0.91 m) thick and the above-ground walls are 2.5 feet (0.76 m) thick. The red sandstone bricks used to construct the building were intended to match the surrounding red cliffs. Inside, ceilings rise 29 feet (8.8 m) high with a plaster cornice, supported by twenty columns. A gallery was built ten feet off the ground on the north, south, and east walls, with two circular staircases serving the east end. An organ was added in 1878. All materials were local, except for windows, shipped from Wilmington, California. When completed, the church could seat 1,200 people. The clock tower was originally used by the city residents to tell time.

The tabernacle still stands and earned the nickname "jewel of the desert". It underwent restoration in 1993 to help it resemble its original state. The building is open to the public and hosts church services and local events, such as public concerts.
