= St. George Children's Museum =

- Discover • Imagine • Create

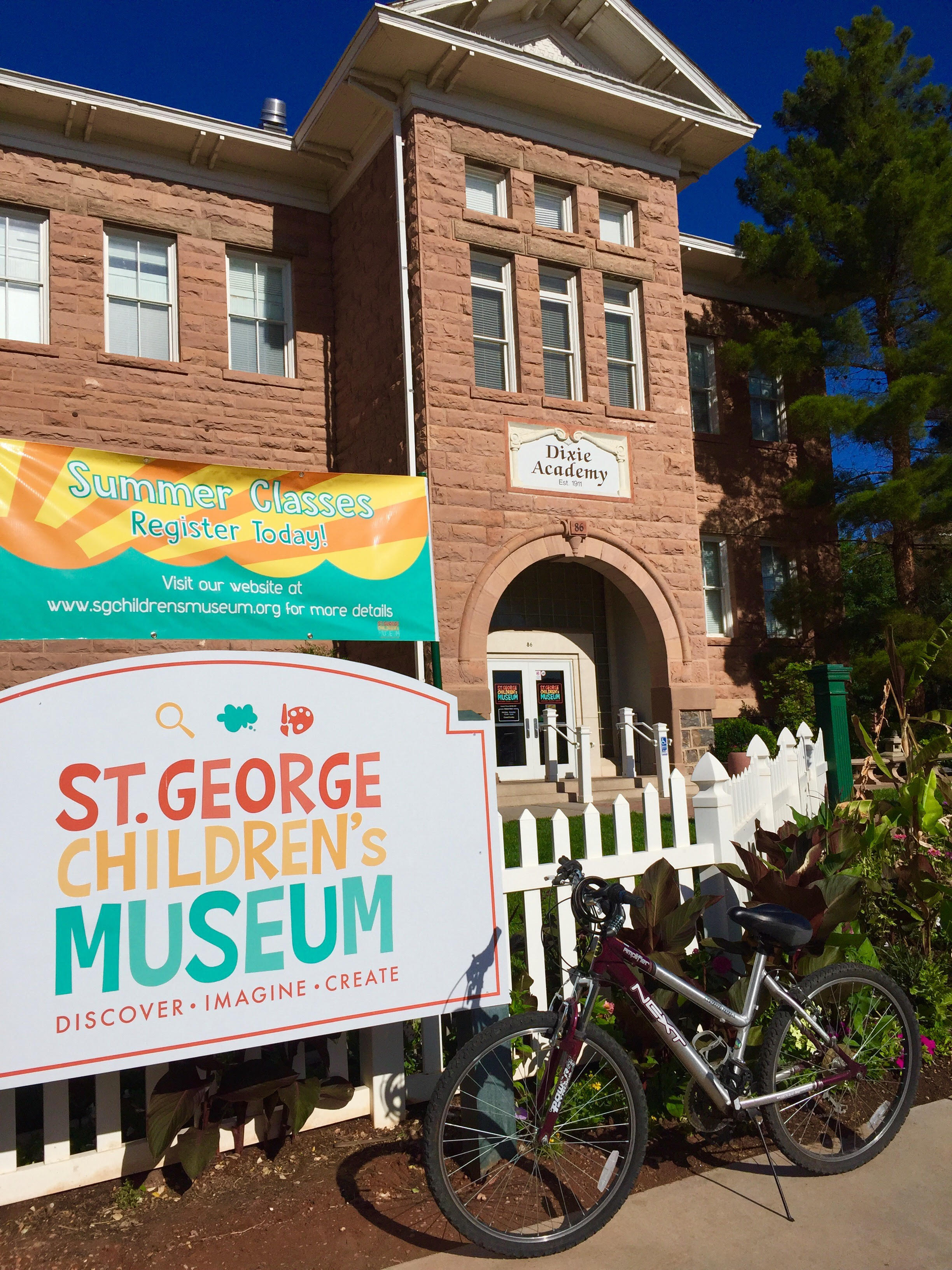
- Museum entrance
- Established: 2013
- Location: 86 South Main Street, St. George, Utah, USA
- Coordinates: 37°06′25″N 113°35′02″W
- Type: Children's museum
- Website: www.sgchildrensmuseum.org

St. George Children's Museum is a nonprofit children's museum in St. George, Utah, USA.

== History ==
Situated in the historic Dixie Academy building, the museum officially opened in November 2013. Planning had begun much earlier with an interest in the community for an interactive space for children. Four women - Paula Bell, Althea Southwick, Dawn Sandberg and Kay Bowen - met over a period of years to talk about their vision of providing opportunities for children to interact with intentionally chosen objects to make discoveries of their own. The main challenge was the lack of a proper venue and funds. Gail Bunker, an elected St. George City Council member and part of the early local children's museum volunteer committee, with the assistance of others, presented the committee's ideas. The St. George City Council approved their plans, and they moved forward with converting the basement level of the former county courthouse into a children's museum. It gave them a start in spurring more public interest and fundraising.

The board of directors was organized in 2010 to address the challenges of location, funding, set-up and receiving a nonprofit status. The tax-exempt status became official in September 2012 and, in 2013, the mayor, Dan McArthur, and Bunker announced that the City of St. George would allow the use of the historic Leisure Arts Building (Dixie Academy) hoping it would help toward an ongoing effort to revitalize the downtown area. In addition, the Discovery Children's Museum (formerly the Lied Discovery Children's Museum) of Las Vegas, preparing to move to a larger location with new exhibits, donated more than $1 million worth of items and sold some other items for $40,000. The museum welcomed its first visitors on November 21, 2013, since when it has continued to sustain, maintain, update and enhance its exhibits.

== Exhibits ==
The 10,000 square feet (930 m^{2}) museum contains ten rooms across two levels. The building has an elevator and an accessible entrance in the back near the parking lot. The top floor of the building is rented out by the City for special events and is not part of the museum.

Lower level

- Prehistoric Discovery
- Red Cliffs Desert Reserve Discovery
- Sports Room
- Science Exhibit
- Music Exhibit
- Art Exhibit
- Castle Exhibit

Main floor

- Boots Cox Dairy Farm
- Skywest Airport and Stephen Wade Auto Shop
- Tuachan Theater
- Government
- State Farm of Southern Utah Bank
- Smith's Grocery Store
- Kids at Work

The main floor also contains a main street themed hallway, party room, administrative office and restrooms.
