= Dixie High School (Utah) =

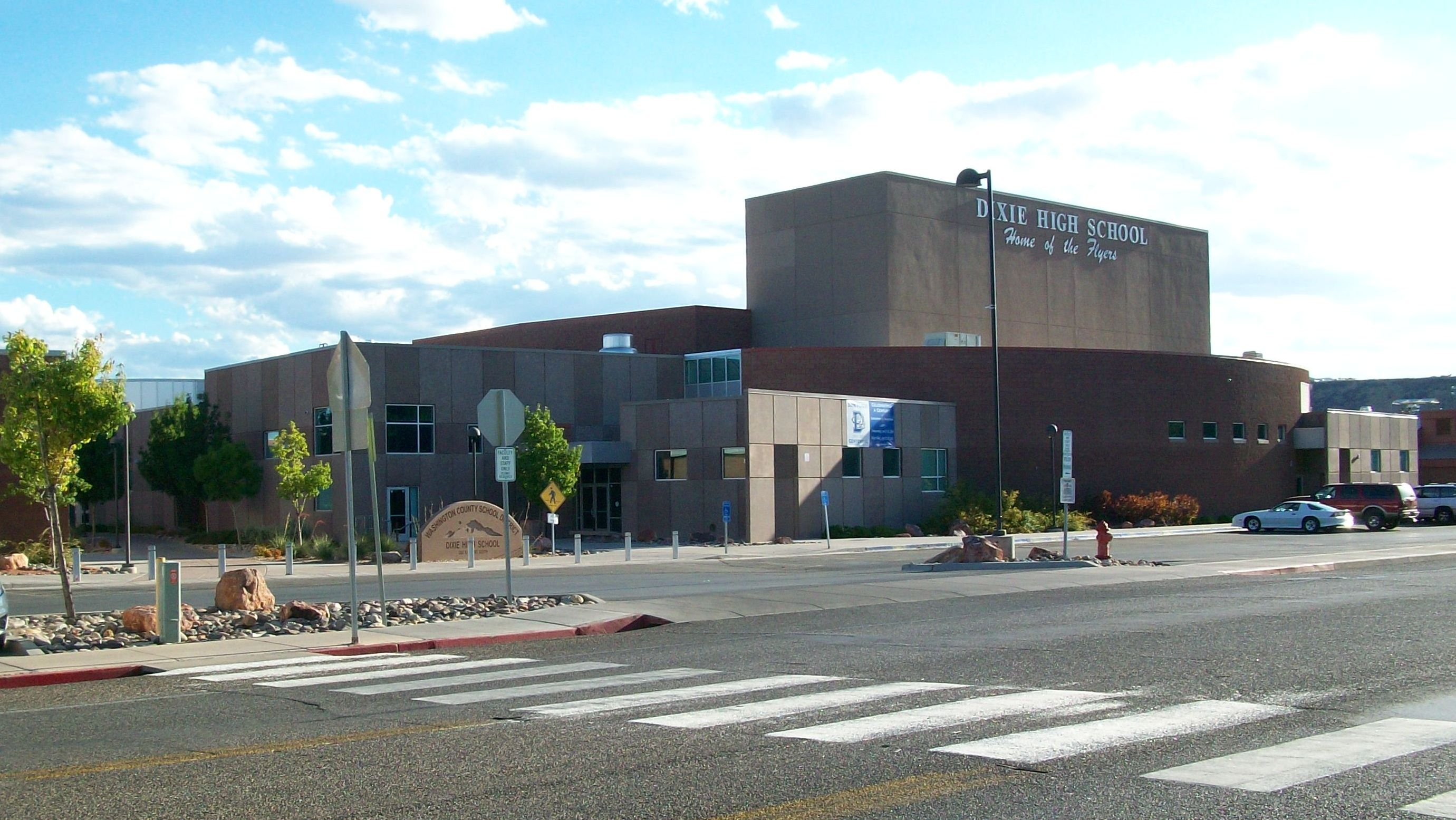

Location
- 350 E 700 S Saint George, Utah 84770; United States; 37°05′45″N 113°34′35″W

Information
- Type: Public
- Motto: Pace Deo a Posse ad Esse (In God's peace from possibility to actuality)
- Established: 1911
- School district: Washington County School District
- Principal: Warren Brooks
- Teaching staff: 56.13 (FTE)
- Enrollment: 1,209 (2023–2024)
- Student to teacher ratio: 21.54
- Colors: Blue, White and Black
- Mascot: Freddie on the fly
- Team name: Flyers
- Website: Dixie High School website

Dixie High School is a public secondary school, in St. George, Utah, United States. Belonging to the Washington County School District, it reported 1,248 students in October 2018. The school's mascot is the Flyers and is represented by a World War I-era biplane pilot.

== History ==
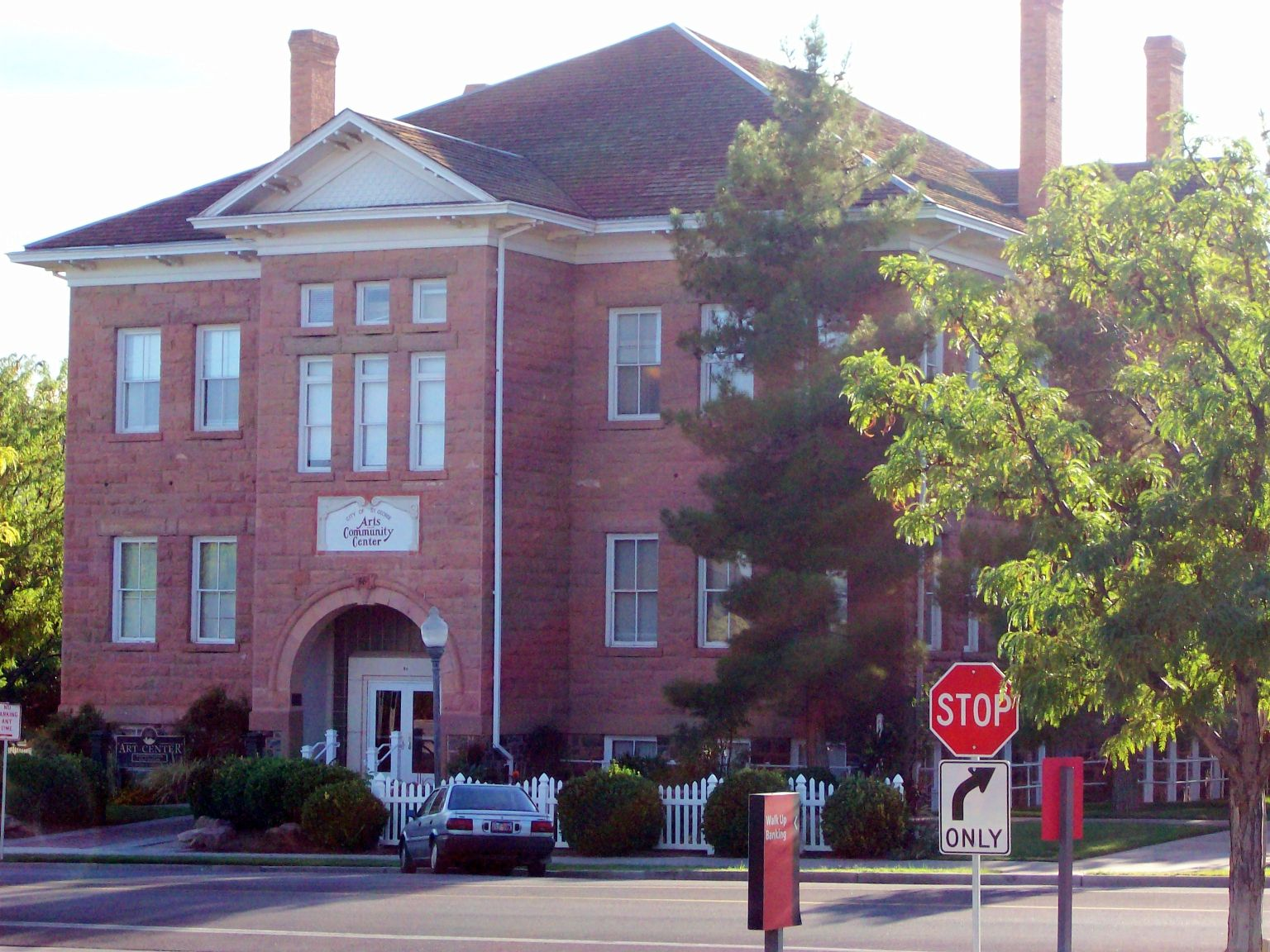
Academy Building, original home of Dixie High School

Dixie High School traces its history back to the September 1911 opening of the St. George Stake Academy, which was the first successful secondary school in St. George. Eventually, the academy incorporated "Dixie" into its name (after a regional nickname), becoming Dixie Academy (and later Dixie College).

The tradition of whitewashing the word "DIXIE" on a sandstone rock formation overlooking the St. George valley (the Sugarloaf) began in 1913.

In 1963, Dixie High School was split from Dixie College (which eventually became Utah Tech University).

=== New campus ===
Up through its separation with Dixie College, the high school had remained at its original 1911 campus. In March 1965, the school district awarded Carter Brothers Construction Company of Cedar City, Utah the contract to build a new 28-acre (11 ha) campus for the high school along St. George's 700 South street. The new campus first opened for classes on August 31, 1966, followed by a public open house and dedication in December 1966. Designed by architect Paul K. Evans, the high school contained 74,000 square feet (6,900 m^{2}) of space. Between the classrooms, laboratories, shop areas, and gymnasium there were 19 teaching areas, plus an 800-person auditorium, library, and lunchroom, along with teacher work rooms and administrative offices.

By the late-1990s, the campus was no longer up to current standards and the school board began the process of replacing the ageing buildings. The first phase of the project constructed a new 36,028-square-foot (3,347.1 m^{2}) building with an auditorium and classrooms for band, drama, and choir. Completed in 2001, the first production in the new auditorium was "Peter Pan." In 2004, a three-story classroom and administrative wing was opened. Constructed on the south end of the 2001 auditorium and music building, this wing added 154,000 square feet (14,300 m^{2}) space to the school. Most of the old high school campus was then torn down, except for the CTE building and an old gymnasium. An additional gymnasium, along with new exercise and locker facilities were then added to the surviving gymnasium, creating an athletics building on part of the former footprint of the 1966 school. A section of floor bearing the school's crest was salvaged from the 1966 building for placement in the new high school.

== Notable alumni ==
- Dia Frampton, musician
- Meg Frampton, musician
- Kelly Graves, women's basketball head coach at Gonzaga University
- Bruce C. Hafen, first Quorum of Seventy, The Church of Jesus Christ of Latter-day Saints
- Jeffrey R. Holland, Apostle, The Church of Jesus Christ of Latter-day Saints
- Bruce Hurst, Major League Baseball pitcher
- Doug Jolley, National Football League tight end
- John Edward Jones, caver who died in the Nutty Putty Cave
- Raven Quinn, musician
- Elwood Romney, All-American basketball player at BYU
- Maurine Whipple, author
