= Utah's Dixie =

Cultural region in the southwest of the U.S. state of Utah

"Utah's Dixie" usually refers to Washington County, highlighted in red on this county map of Utah.

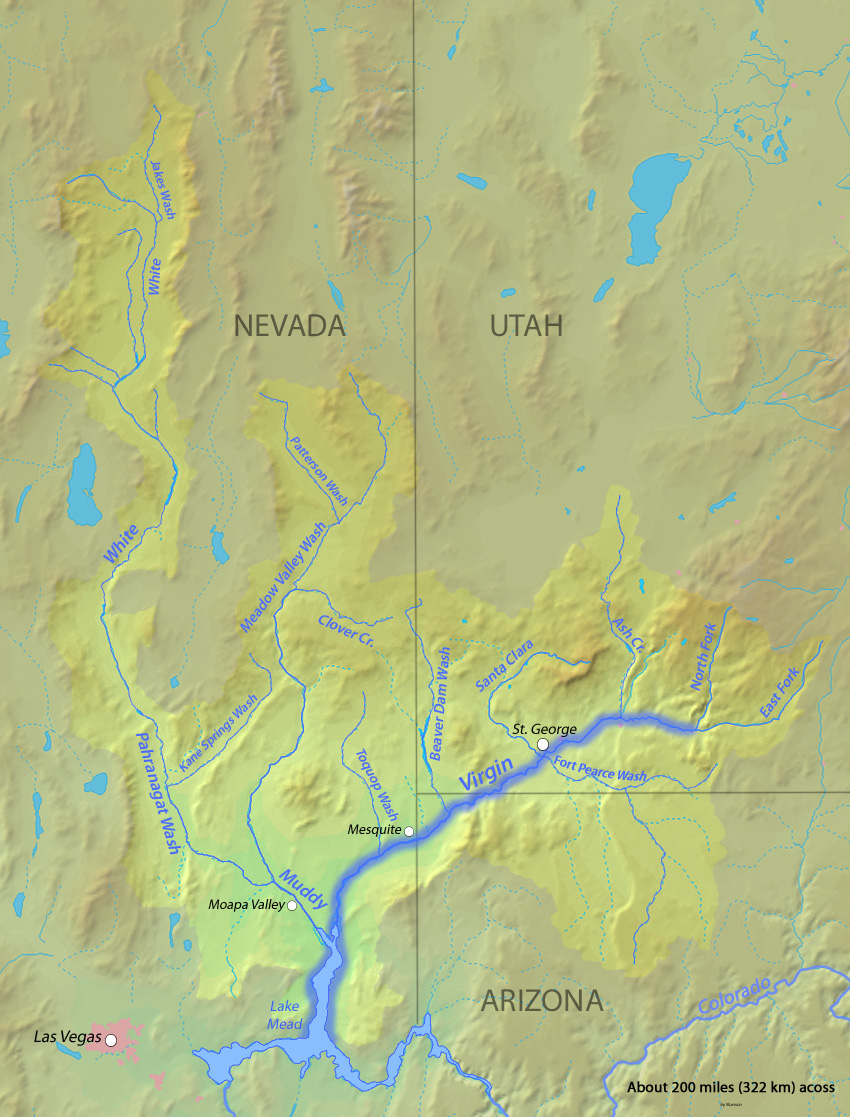
Southwestern Utah is in the upper Colorado River Basin.

Dixie is a nickname for a region in southwest Utah, especially south-central Washington County. The area is in the northeastern Mojave Desert, south of Black Ridge and west of the Hurricane Cliffs. Its winters are significantly milder than the rest of Utah.

The region is nicknamed "Dixie" after the original Dixie region (Southeastern United States), due to the warmer climate, the importance of cotton, and the Southern origins of some early settlers. Use of the term "Dixie" to describe this Utah region has been controversial due to associations with the American Civil War, the Confederate States, and slavery.

Originally inhabited by Southern Paiutes, the area became part of the United States after the Mexican–American War, in the subsequent Mexican Cession of 1849 of lands in the Old Southwest. The following year, portions of it were organized by the United States Congress and approved by the U.S. president as the new federal Utah Territory. In 1854, Mormons (LDS Church) moved to the area from the Great Salt Lake region to establish church president and territorial governor Brigham Young's intended Indian mission in the region. After arrival, the settlers led by Jacob Hamblin in Santa Clara, began growing cotton and other temperate cash crops in and around the town. By 1860, the Paiute native population had declined due to disease and gradual displacement by the new white settlers.

== The Cotton Mission ==
The area was first referred to as the "Cotton Mission", in response to Brigham Young's 14th General Epistle issued in October 1856. He was determined that the Great Basin region surrounding the Great Salt Lake and extending to the west and south should be self-sufficient. He criticized his fellow Latter-day Saints as "quite negligent in raising cotton and flax." His emphatic command was: "And let our brethren who have the means, bring on cotton and woolen machinery, that we may be enabled to manufacture our own goods, so fast as we shall be able to supply ourselves with the raw material...."

=== Origin ===
"[The] first groups of settlers [arriving in Spring 1857] – the Adair and Covington Companies – were from further east in the southern states, mainly Mississippi, Alabama, Virginia, Texas, and Tennessee." While there is no indication that slavery was practiced in Utah's cotton farming, Robert Dockery Covington, the leader of the second company of Latter-day Saints, was a former slave overseer and was listed in earlier U.S. Decennial Census records as owning eight slaves per the 1840 Census, which made "farming a very profitable occupation." It is unknown whether Covington had grown cotton or supervised slaves who grew cotton. A contemporary said: "He was a strong Rebel sympathizer and rejoiced whenever he heard of a Southern victory." Covington was the first president of the LDS Church's Washington Branch. Covington's first counselor was Alexander Washington Collins, who the contemporary said was a former slave driver known to publicly and humorously tell horrific stories of whippings and rapes of his slaves.

Andrew Larson's landmark history of the area in 1992 states that it was already referred to as "Dixie" by 1857:

Already the settled area of the Virgin Valley was being called Utah's "Dixie". The fact that cotton would grow there, as well as tobacco and other semi-tropical plants such as the South, produced made it easy for the name to stick. The fact that the settlers at Washington were bona fide Southerners who were steeped in the lore of cotton culture—many of them, at least—clinched the title. Dixie it became, and Dixie it remained. ... The name "Dixie" is one of those distinctive things about this part of Utah ... It is a proud title.

— Andrew Larson, I Was Called to Dixie (p. 185)[Emphasis in original]

=== Early challenges ===
"[T]he harsh environment, the intense heat of summer, the continual toil, and the ravages of malaria . . . led some of the settlers to desert the place at the end of the first season." In the fall of 1858, it was reported "that of approximately 400 acres planted to cotton only 130 acres could be counted a success". Cultivation of cotton and food crops depended on irrigation, which was a collective activity. There were regular food shortages, including "the 'starving time' when many people were reduced to eating pigweed, alfalfa, and carrot top greens in lieu of a more substantial diet". The area's culture included a shared religion, shared suffering and success, and even a collective economy for a time.

=== End of the Cotton Mission ===
The Cotton Mission did not work as well as Young had hoped. Yields in the test fields were not as high as expected, and growing cotton never gained economic viability, although a cotton mill was built and used for a few years in the Town of Washington. "[C]onsistent operation of the Factory" ended in 1897.

== The name "Dixie" ==
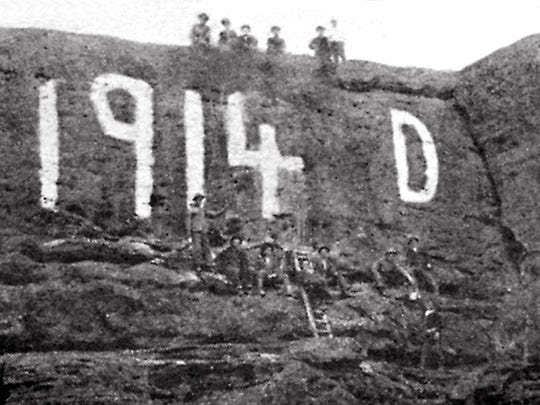
Prominent landmark red rock hill named "Sugarloaf" (a.k.a. "Dixie Rock") overlooking nearby town of St. George, Utah, county seat of surrounding Washington County in southwest Utah's Dixie region, pictured with "1914 D" markings / graffiti from graduating class of nearby state college. (photo taken c.1914).

Local residents and others in Utah used "Dixie" to refer to the area. In 1915, the LDS Church-sponsored St. George Stake Academy, founded four years earlier in 1911, officially became reorganized, secularized and renamed as the Dixie Academy (now Utah Tech University). Shortly thereafter, "Dixie" was painted on Sugarloaf, the nearby prominent red rock hill above the county seat town of St. George. "Dixie Rock", as it became known, previously had been painted with the year of the college's graduating class and a "D".

== "Dixie" controversy ==
Controversy over the use of "Dixie" has repeatedly arisen in the larger Southern Utah community.

=== Dixie State University ===
The Confederate flag was removed as a Dixie College symbol in 1993. The Confederate soldier "Rodney the Rebel" was eliminated as the mascot in 2005 and the nickname "Rebels" was discontinued in 2007.

That same year, the Dixie State College administration considered affiliation with the University of Utah, and "U.U. officials said dropping the 'baggage' of Dixie would be mandatory." "'Dixie' has connotations of the Old South, the Confederacy, and racism," Randy Dryer, then the chairman of the university's trustees, wrote to the academic journal The Chronicle of Higher Education. The affiliation with the University of Utah did not happen at that time.

In 2012, many articles appeared as the college was about to make "the leap to university status next year". The Salt Lake Tribune, the state's largest and influential daily newspaper in the state capital and largest city in Utah, editorialized that the school needed a new name based on the pioneer origin of the name, and Confederacy-honoring practices of the students. An African American student told the Tribune he was shocked to find old college yearbooks with photos "of students in blackface, holding mock slave auctions, dressed in Confederate uniforms and staging parade floats and skits that seem to ridicule blacks, such as a crowd in black face behind a white student dressed as a Col. Sanders-type figure. 'In 1968 they were still doing minstrel shows,'" he said. The college student body president said in 2012 that when "on recruiting trips to California that he encountered students unwilling to consider studying at a place called Dixie. "One said, 'Your name makes me shudder,' and walked away ..." Faculty members who raised the issue complained about being asked to leave the community.

In July 2015, following the Charleston church shooting, Dannelle Larsen-Rife again editorialized for renaming Dixie State University. She was interviewed on an episode of the state-wide public radio program "RadioWest" on station KUER-FM, with professors from the University of Utah and the University of Wyoming. A substantial statue of rebel soldiers and a horse, with a Confederate flag displayed, was returned to its sculptor.

In 2020, in the wake of the incident of the murder of George Floyd by city police officers in Minneapolis, Minnesota, and the extensive nationwide subsequent protests, the issue again returned to the forefront of public attention. Jamie Belnap, a former resident of St. George, wrote "Now, seven years after the vote at DSU [to retain the Dixie name], murmurings about the name 'Dixie' have begun again. There's a new petition and, unsurprisingly, online detractors from the community have already begun to emerge.... Isn't it time DSU sends a message to its students of color that it cares more about equality than nostalgia?" On December 14, 2020, the University's board of trustees voted to recommend removing the word Dixie from the school's name. The 2021 session of the Utah Legislature meeting in the Utah State Capitol in Salt Lake City voted to take the recommendation, starting a year-long process to solicit input and consider alternative names. The Board of Trustees of D.S.U. and the Utah State Board of Education both voted unanimously voted to move forward with the new name of "Utah Tech University". Earlier than expected, after in November 2021, the Utah State Legislature was called into a special session by 18th Governor of Utah Spencer Cox (born 1975, serving since 2021). While the primary purpose for that session was to approve redistricting maps following the 2020 U.S. Decennial Census, The name change bill for Dixie State was also included on topics to be raised and discussed by Utah legislators that term. While the issue continued to be contentious, the decision to bring the issue early into special session at the State Capitol was made because leaders felt no more information was needed, only a vote and decision. Both chambers of the bicameral state legislature voted on November 10, 2021 to change the name of the university near St. George to Utah Tech University effective eight months later in July 2022.

=== Dixie Convention Center ===
In 2020, controversy also affected the name of the Dixie Convention Center. After a rebranding study, the governing board voted to change the Dixie Center name to Greater Zion Convention Center, consistent with the area's already renamed Greater Zion Convention and Tourism Office, which had an earlier name change the year before in 2019. "The vote to change [the Convention Center name] to Greater Zion on June 23 led to a flood of social media posts and an online petition that gathered over 17,000 signatures of public citizens in favor of keeping Dixie as the name." "[A]fter a public comment period in which multiple community members expressed strong support of the Dixie name, the Interlocal Agency amended the motion to temporarily revert to the Dixie Center name and to meet again on the issue in six months."

=== Dixie Regional Medical Center ===
On July 16, 2020, Intermountain Health Care announced that the Dixie Regional Medical Center’s name would become Intermountain St. George Regional Hospital effective six months later on January 1, 2021. Mitch Cloward, hospital administrator, said "The meaning of Dixie is not clear for everyone. For some, it only requires explanation; for others, who are not from this area, it has offensive connotations.... Our hospital name should be strong, clear and make everyone we serve feel safe and welcome."

== Today ==
The largest community in the region, St. George, was founded in 1861, when Brigham Young selected 300 families to take over that area and grow cotton, grapes, and other crops. Other communities in Washington County include Ivins, Santa Clara, Hurricane, LaVerkin, and Toquerville. The population is nearly 180,000 in the metropolitan area.
