= St. George Elementary School (Utah) =

Former historic school building in St. George, Utah, U.S.

- Formerly listed on the U.S. National Register of Historic Places
- Location: St. George, Utah, United States
- Coordinates: 37°6′27.7″N 113°35′8.5″W
- Built: 1935–1936
- Architectural style: PWS Moderne and Colonial Revival
- Demolished: April 2001
- NRHP reference No.: 85000820

Significant dates
- Added to NRHP: April 1, 1985
- Removed from NRHP: December 29, 2025

The St. George Elementary School (also known as the Annex Building) was a historic school building in St. George, Utah. Opened in 1936, it housed grades one through six, which were brought over from the older Woodward School building across the street.

The building continued as the elementary until 1955, when classes were moved to two new elementary school buildings in the city. It then functioned as overflow space for various schools, becoming the Annex Building of the Woodward School Complex. The structure was added to the National Register of Historic Places (NRHP) in April 1985. In 2001, the structure was torn down and a new office building for the Washington County School District was built on its former location.

== Description ==
The building was a two-story red brick structure, with a long rectangular floor plan. Its style was a blend of PWS Moderne and Colonial Revival.

== History ==
Construction of the building began in fall 1935 and was completed for the opening of school in fall 1936. It was built by the Public Works Administration (PWA), one of several New Deal programs created by the US federal government during the Great Depression. Once completed, grades one through six were brought over from the Woodward School across the street, where they had been held since 1901. Classes in the new building started on September 14, 1936.

The structure was added to the NRHP in April 1985, although Washington School District officials had disapproved of the building being listed, claiming it wasn't "historical enough."

=== Woodward School Complex ===
In 1955, East Elementary and West Elementary were opened and the old elementary building was turned over to the Woodward Junior-Senior High School, and was referred to as the Annex Building. The junior high moved to a new building in 1977, after which the Woodward complex of buildings continued to be used by the school district as overflow space for students. Due to significant population growth in the area, it was decided to remodel the Woodward complex into a "Sixth Grade Center" and move sixth grade classes from the middle school to the center (including the annex, which held nine of the classes). Following a $100,000 (equivalent to $299,350 in 2025) renovation of the complex, the center opened for students in August 1985. In December 1997, the school board decided to close the sixth grade center, due to the aging buildings. The center was closed following completion of the school year in May 2000.

=== Demolition ===
Following its vote to close the school, the school board established the 15-member Woodward Community Committee, chaired by Scott Hirschi, to investigate possible future uses for the school complex. During a tour of the building in February 1998, the committee found that a beam had suffered cracking and the lunchroom, once the gymnasium, suffered flooding during rainstorms as its floor was lower the adjacent outside sidewalk.

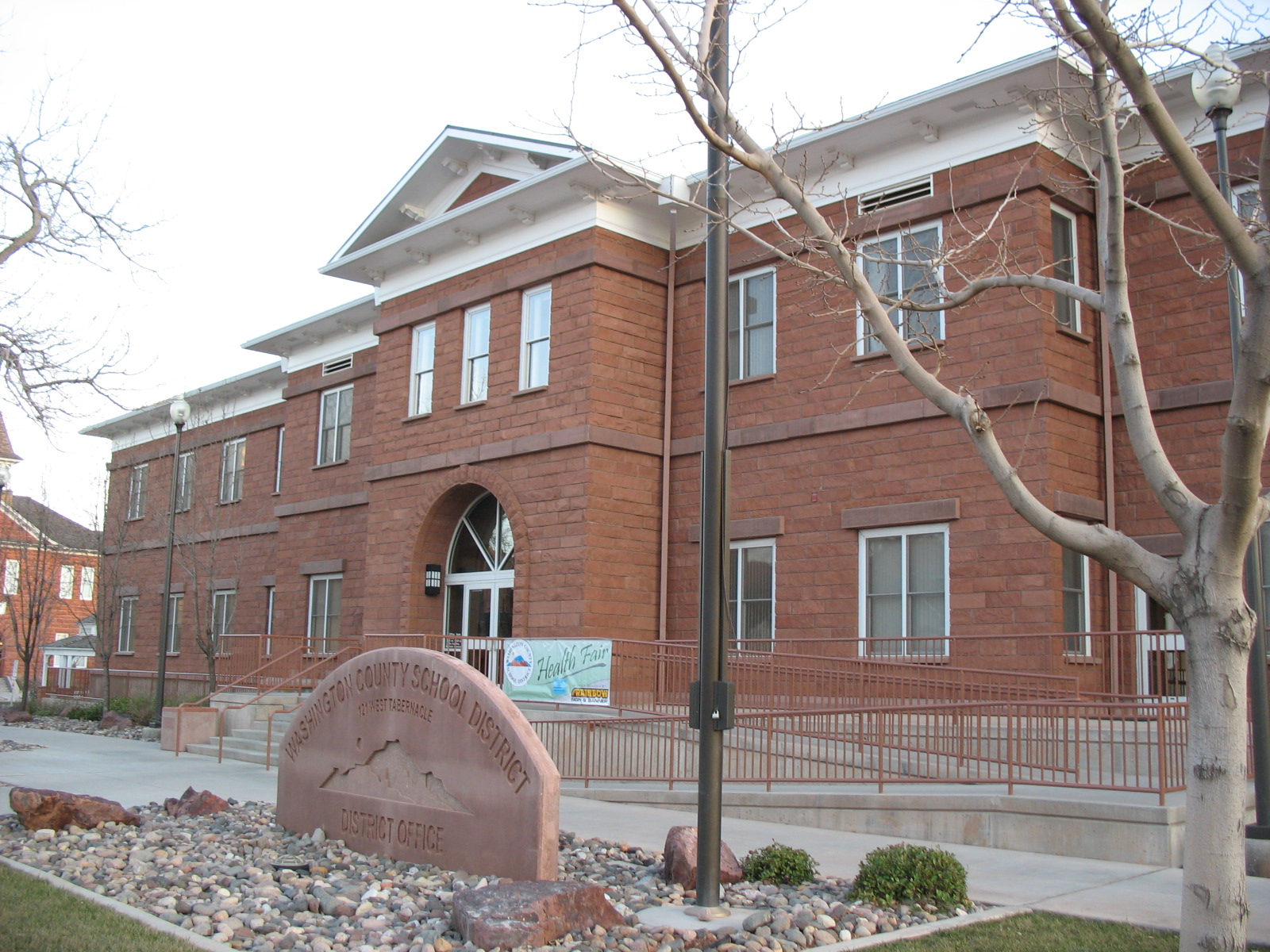
The Washington County School District office building, constructed on the site of the former elementary school

During preliminary planning, the committee considered recommending that Millcreek Alternative High School be moved from the Washington School into the Annex Building. However, during the committee's report to the school board in August 1998, the location of the Annex Building was recommended for school district offices, if the option to remodel the Woodward School into offices was not chosen. A year later, the recommendation was followed and the board decided that the Annex Building would be torn down and replaced with a new district office building.

The elementary/annex building was demolished in April 2001, and a new school district office building was constructed on a portion of its former location, opening in summer 2002.

== See also ==
- National Register of Historic Places listings in Washington County, Utah
