= Holmes House =

Holmes House may refer to:

== United Kingdom ==
- Holmes House, South Duffield, North Yorkshire, England

== United States ==
(by state then city)

- Holmes-Shannon House, Los Angeles, California, listed on the National Register of Historic Places (NRHP)
- Francis H. Holmes House, New Britain, Connecticut, listed on the NRHP in Hartford County
- Samuel Holmes House, Highland Park, Illinois, listed on the NRHP in Lake County
- Perrigo-Holmes House, Boone, Iowa, listed on the NRHP in Boone County
- Sen. John Holmes House, Alfred, Maine, NRHP-listed
- Holmes Cottage, Calais, Maine, listed on the NRHP in Washington County
- Dr. Job Holmes House, Calais, Maine, listed on the NRHP in Washington County
- Holmes-Crafts Homestead, North Jay, Maine, listed on the NRHP in Franklin County
- Joseph Holmes House, Cambridge, Massachusetts, NRHP-listed
- Oliver Wendell Holmes House, Beverly, Massachusetts, NRHP-listed
- Nels A. Holmes Farmstead, Stambaugh, Michigan, listed on the NRHP in Iron County
- Holmes House (Magnolia, Mississippi), listed on the NRHP in Pike County
- William Frederick Holmes House, McComb, Mississippi, listed on the NRHP in Pike County
- John Holmes House, Cape May Court House, New Jersey, NRHP-listed
- Holmes–Hendrickson House, Holmdel, New Jersey, listed on the NRHP in Monmouth County
- Holmes–Tallman House, Monroe Township, New Jersey, listed on the NRHP in Middlesex County
- Benjamin Holmes House, Salem, New Jersey, NRHP-listed
- Sedberry-Holmes House, Fayetteville, North Carolina, listed on the NRHP in Cumberland County
- Gustavus Holmes House, Astoria, Oregon, listed on the NRHP in Clatsop County
- William L. Holmes House, Oregon City, Oregon, listed on the NRHP in Clackamas County
- Zack Holmes House, Rapid City, South Dakota, listed on the NRHP in Pennington County

== See also ==
- Holmes on Homes (TV series) renovation TV show
- Holmes (disambiguation)
