= Holmes =

Holmes may refer to:

== People and fictional characters ==
- Holmes (surname), a list of people and fictional characters
  - Sherlock Holmes, a fictional detective
- Holmes (given name), a list of people
- Gordon Holmes, a penname used by Louis Tracy (1863–1928), British journalist and fiction writer

== Places ==
=== In the United States ===
- Holmes, California, an unincorporated community
- Holmes, Iowa, an unincorporated community
- Holmes, Kentucky, an unincorporated community
- Holmes, Pennsylvania, an unincorporated community
- Holmes, a hamlet within Pawling (town), New York
- Holmes Township, Michigan
- Holmes City Township, Minnesota
- Holmes Township, Crawford County, Ohio
- Holmes County, Florida
- Holmes County, Mississippi
- Holmes County, Ohio
- Mount Holmes (Utah)
- Mount Holmes (Wyoming), Yellowstone National Park, Wyoming
- Fort Holmes, Mackinac Island, Michigan
- Holmes Island (Indiana), an island and community
- Holmes Island (Washington), an island
- Holmes Reservation, a conservation parcel in Plymouth, Massachusetts

=== In Antarctica ===
- Holmes Summit
- Holmes Glacier
- Holmes Hills
- Holmes Ridge
- Holmes Island (Antarctica)
- Holmes Rock
- Holmes Bluff
- Holmes Block, a bluff
- Mount Holmes (Antarctica)

=== In outer space ===
- 17P/Holmes, a comet
- 5477 Holmes, an asteroid
- Holmes (crater), a crater on Mars

=== Elsewhere ===
- Holmes, Northern Territory, Australia, a suburb in Darwin
- Holmes River, British Columbia, Canada
- Holmes, Lancashire, a village in West Lancashire, England

== Schools ==
- Holmes Community College, Mississippi
- Holmes Junior/Senior High School, the oldest high school in Kentucky
- Holmes Middle School (Colorado Springs, Colorado)
- Holmes Middle School (Livonia, Michigan)

== Ships ==
- HMS Holmes, two British Royal Navy ships
- USS Holmes, two United States Navy ships

== Other uses ==
- HOLMES 2, an IT system used by the police in the United Kingdom
- Holmes Airport, a former airport located in Queens in New York City
- Holmes railway station, Rotherham, South Yorkshire, England
- Holmes Products, a United States small-appliance producer
- Holmes (computer)
- Holmes (TV series), a news and current affairs show that aired in New Zealand
- Baron Holmes, two titles in the Peerage of Ireland

== See also ==
- Holmes House (disambiguation), various houses on the National Register of Historic Places
- Holmes Towers, two public housing in Manhattan, New York City
- Holm (disambiguation)
- Holme (disambiguation)
