= Mount Holmes =

Mount Holmes may refer to:

- Mount Holmes (Antarctica)
- Mount Holmes (Utah)
- Mount Holmes (Wyoming), a mountain in the Gallatin Range in Yellowstone National Park

== See also ==
- Holmes (disambiguation)
