= Holmen =

Holmen or Holmens (in genitive) means a small island or islet in Danish, Norwegian, and Swedish, and may refer to:

== Places ==
=== Denmark ===
- Holmen, Copenhagen, a district in central Copenhagen
  - Holmen Church, church in central Copenhagen
  - Holmen Cemetery, oldest cemetery in Copenhagen
  - Holmens Kanal, street in central Copenhagen
  - Holmen Naval Base, naval base, today mainly located in Nyholm, Copenhagen

=== Norway ===
- Holmen, Oslo, a neighbourhood in Oslo
  - Holmen (station), a station on the Røa Line of the Oslo Metro system
  - Holmenkollen, a mountain and a neighbourhood in the Vestre Aker borough of Oslo; known for its international skiing competitions
- Holmen, Asker, a village in Asker municipality, Akershus county
  - Holmen IF, a sports club from Asker
    - Holmen Hockey, the ice hockey division of Holmen IF
- Holmen (Drammen), a central island in Drammen where most of the car imports for Norway arrive
- Holmen, Målselv, a hamlet in Målselv municipality, Troms county
- Holmen Church (Sigdal), principal parish church for Sigdal municipality, located at Prestfoss

=== United States ===
- Holmen, Wisconsin, a village in southwest Wisconsin
  - Holmen High School

== Other ==
- Holmen (surname)
- Holmen (company), a Swedish forest industry group

== See also ==
- -hou
- Holm (disambiguation)
- Holme (disambiguation)
- Holmes (disambiguation)
