= Holmes Island =

Holmes Island may refer to:

- Holmes Island (Antarctica), an island
- Holmes Island (Indiana), an island and community
- Holmes Island (Washington), an island
