= William Henry Holmes =

American academic, painter, and illustrator

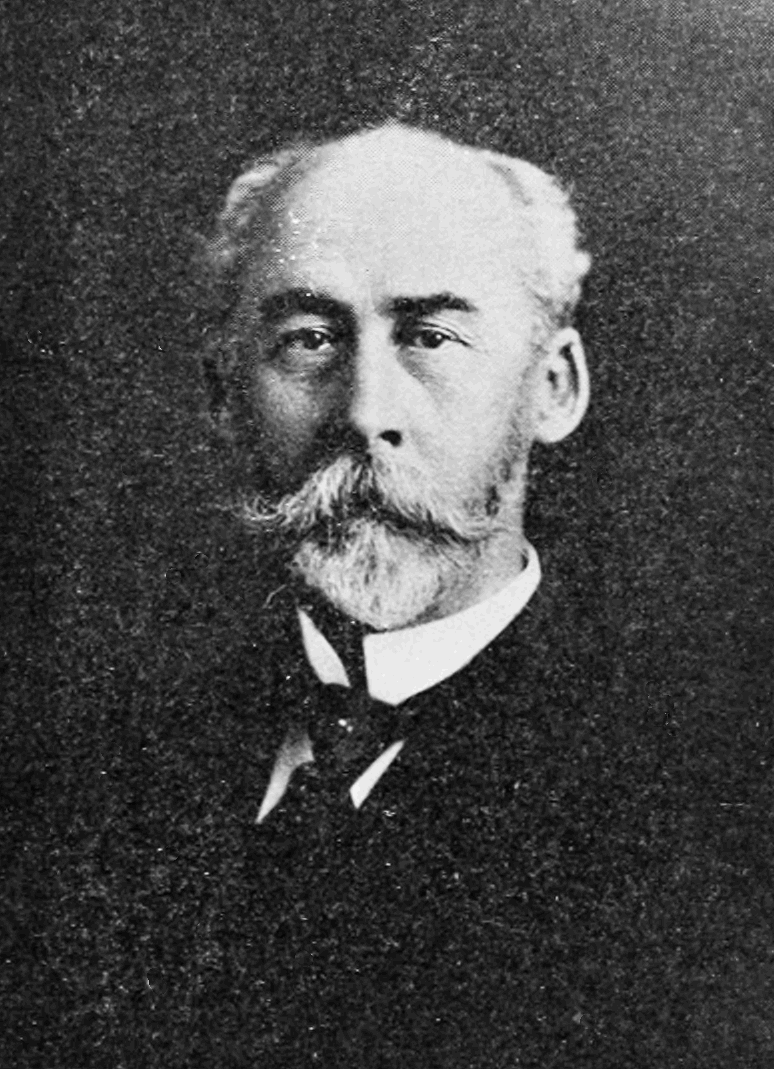
- Holmes in 1918
- Born: December 1, 1846; Harrison County, Ohio, U.S.
- Died: April 20, 1933 (aged 86); Royal Oak, Michigan, U.S.
- Resting place: Rock Creek Cemetery; Washington, D.C., U.S.
- Known for: Scientific Illustration of the American West; Role in Controversy over the Antiquity of Man in the Americas
- Spouse: Kate Clifton Osgood Holmes (m. 1883)
- Awards: Loubat Prize (1898, 1923)
- Scientific career
- Fields: Anthropology, Archaeology, Art, Scientific Illustration, Cartography, Curator, Geology
- Workplaces: Smithsonian Institution, Field Museum of Natural History

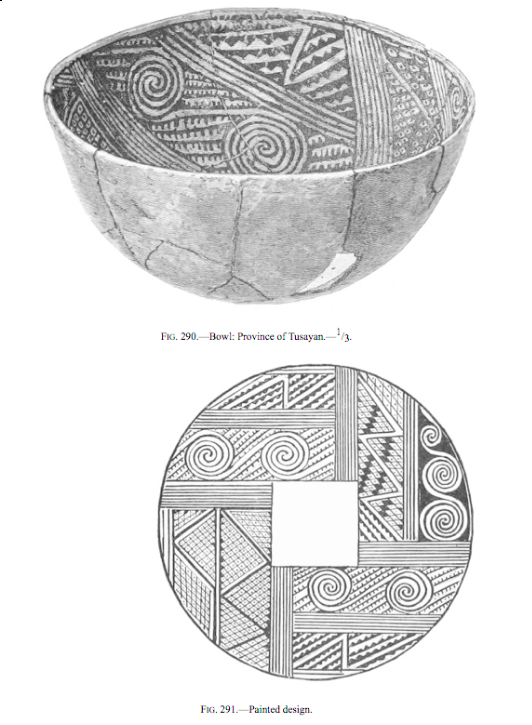
Tusayan bowl, illustration from Holmes, Pottery of the Ancient Pueblos, 1886

William Henry Holmes (December 1, 1846 – April 20, 1933), known as W. H. Holmes, was an American explorer, anthropologist, archaeologist, artist, scientific illustrator, cartographer, mountain climber, geologist and museum curator and director.

== Biography ==
=== Early life and education ===
William Henry Holmes was born on a farm near Cadiz, in Harrison County, Ohio, to Joseph and Mary Heberling Holmes on December 1, 1846. One of his forebears was the Rev. Obadiah Holmes, who emigrated to Salem, Massachusetts in 1638. William Henry Holmes graduated from the McNeely Normal School, Hopedale, Ohio in 1870 and afterward briefly taught drawing, painting, natural history, and geology at the school. In 1889 the school awarded him an honorary A.B. (Bachelor of Arts) degree. Later, in 1918, Holmes received an honorary Doctor of Science degree from The George Washington University, Washington, D.C. for his work and achievements.

=== U. S. Geological Surveys ===
==== Hayden Survey ====
In 1871, he went to Washington, D.C., to study art under Theodore Kaufmann. His talent soon came to the attention of the scientists at the Smithsonian Institution, notably Fielding Bradford Meek, and Holmes was employed drawing and sketching fossil shells and shells of live mollusks. In 1872, Holmes became an artist/topographer with the government survey of Ferdinand Vandeveer Hayden, replacing Thomas Moran. His first trip out West was to the newly established Yellowstone National Park. During the 1870s, Holmes gained a national reputation as a scientific illustrator, cartographer, pioneering archaeologist, and geologist. His work on the laccolith influenced Grove Karl Gilbert's own work on the same. In the field, Holmes worked closely with the photographer William H. Jackson and back in Washington he helped produce Hayden's great achievement, the Geological and Geographical Atlas of Colorado, And Portions of Adjacent Territory (1877, 1881).

==== Dutton Survey ====
After the Hayden Survey was absorbed into the U.S. Geological Survey in 1879, Holmes went to Munich, Germany, to further his art studies under Frank Duveneck and to take lessons in "museum making" from Adolphe B. Meyer of Dresden's Anthropology Museum. On Holmes's return to the U.S., he was hired by the Geological Survey and assigned to Clarence Dutton as a geologist and illustrator. Holmes illustrated the atlas for Dutton's Tertiary History of the Grand Canyon District (1882); his triptych panorama of the Grand Canyon from Point Sublime is a masterpiece of American scientific illustration. He was also a noted mountain climber, and a peak in Yellowstone National Park — Mount Holmes — was named in his honor. In 1875, Holmes began studying the remains of the Ancestral Pueblo culture in the San Juan River region of Utah. His models of ancient Indian ruins were a sensation at the Centennial International Exhibition in Philadelphia. Holmes became particularly interested in prehistoric pottery and shell art, producing the published works of "Art in Shell of the American Indians (1883)" and "Pottery of the Ancient Pueblos (1886)". He expanded these studies to include textiles, and he became well known as an expert in both ancient and existing arts produced by Native Americans of the Southwest. In 1889 he discovered and reported Indian petroglyphs in central West Virginia.

=== Smithsonian Institution ===
Holmes left the Geological Survey in 1889 to become an archaeologist with the Smithsonian Institution's Bureau of American Ethnology. He left Washington temporarily, from 1894 to 1897, to serve as curator of anthropology at the Field Columbian Museum in Chicago, during which time he led an expedition to Mexico. He returned to the Smithsonian in 1897 to serve as head curator of anthropology at the U.S. National Museum. From 1902 to 1909 he served as Chief (i.e. director) of the Bureau of American Ethnology, succeeding John Wesley Powell. During this period he studied the Etowah Indian Mounds of the Mississippian culture in Georgia, and in 1903, he published his Synthesis of Pottery. In 1905, Holmes was elected a member of the American Antiquarian Society. In 1910, he became chairman of the Division of Anthropology of the U.S. National Museum. In 1920, Holmes became the director of National Gallery of Art (now the Smithsonian American Art Museum), where he assembled exhibits of Indian arts from the Northwest Coast. He published many works on archæological and anthropological subjects. He edited geological publications, including Hayden's Atlas of Colorado and the eleventh and twelfth reports of the Geological Survey. His books include: "Handbook of Aboriginal American Antiquities" (1919).

In 1899, he was elected as a member to the American Philosophical Society.

=== Later years ===
Holmes lived with his son in Royal Oak, Michigan, upon his retirement in 1932 from the position of Director of the National Gallery of Art. He died April 20, 1933.

=== Art ===
In the year of his death, a memorial exhibition of ninety-two of Holmes' artworks was held at the Corcoran Gallery of Art. As a teacher, his pupils included Susan Brown Chase.

=== Legacy ===
Of Holmes's many contributions and accomplishments, he is probably best known for the role he played in the controversy over the antiquity of humans in the Americas. Holmes insisted that claims for the early presence of humans should be subjected to the most rigorous testing. His position on this matter had a healthy and conservative influence on what is one of the most fundamental questions in American archaeology. There are two mountain summits named in his honor: Mount Holmes in Yellowstone National Park, and Mount Holmes in the Henry Mountains of Utah.

== Selected writings ==
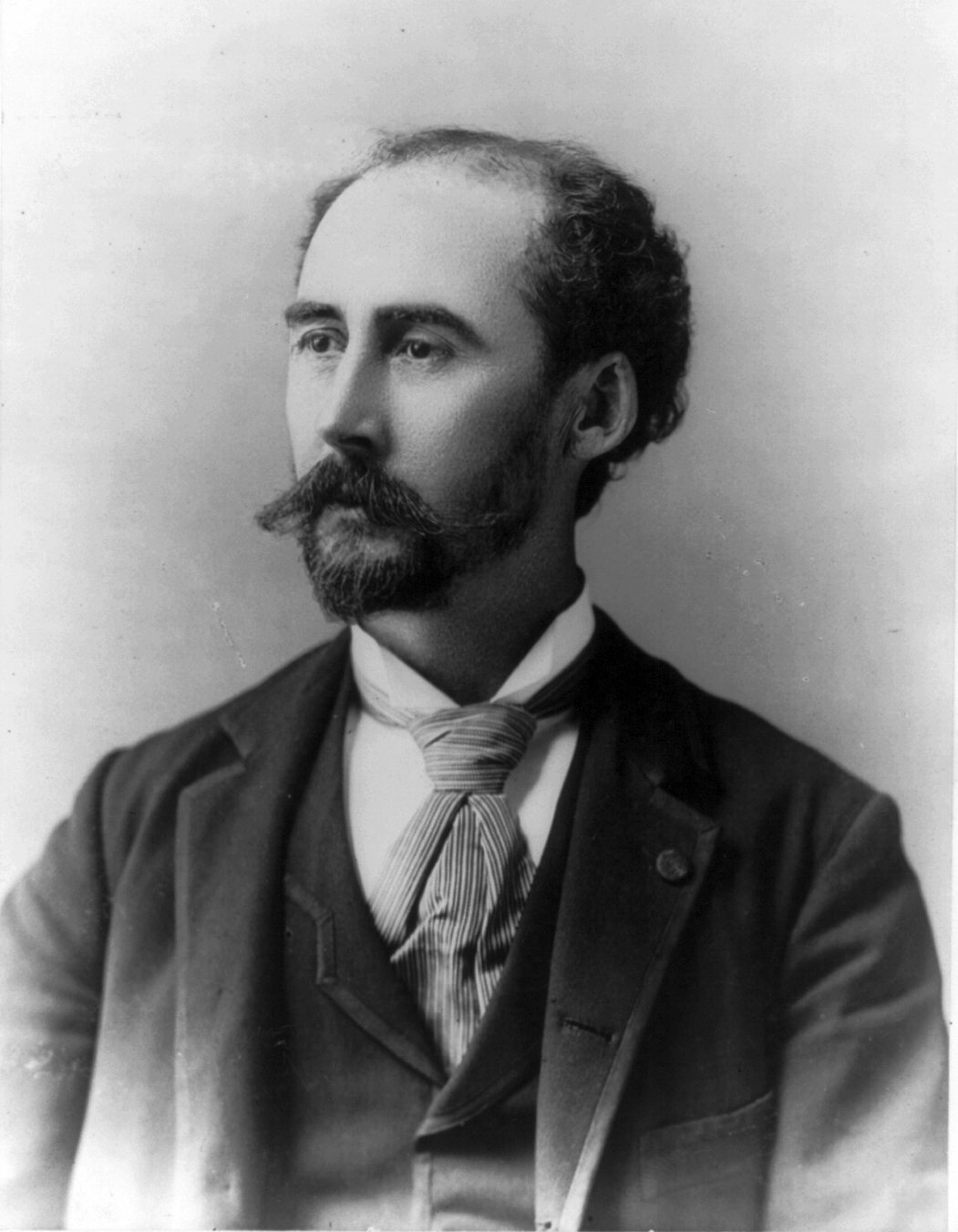
William Henry Holmes

Published and unpublished writings by Holmes include:

- "Ancient Art of the Province of Chiriqui, Colombia [Panama]": Sixth Annual Report of the Bureau of American Ethnology to the Secretary of the Smithsonian Institution 1884–1885, Government Printing Office, Washington, 1888, 187 pages
- Pottery of the Ancient Pueblos (Government Printing Office, Washington, D.C., 1886)
- Prehistoric Textile Art of Eastern United States: Thirteenth Annual Report of the Bureau of American Ethnology to the Secretary of the Smithsonian Institution 1891–1892, Government Printing Office, Washington, 1896 pages 3–46.
- "Natural History of Flaked Stone Implements." In Memoirs of the International Congress of Anthropology, edited by C. S. Wake, pp. 120–139. Schulte, Chicago, Il. (1894)
- Archaeological Studies among the Ancient Cities of Mexico (1895)
- "Stone Implements of the Potomac-Chesapeake Tidewater Province." In Bureau of American Ethnology Annual Report, pp. 13–152. vol. 15. Government Printing Office, Washington, D.C. (1897)
- Random Records of a Lifetime, 1846–1931: Cullings, largely personal, from the scrap heap of three score years and ten, devoted to science, literature and art. 1932. Description: 21 v. in 22. illus. (mounted, part col.) clippings, letters. 27 cm. Held in the Smithsonian American Art and Portrait Gallery Library Rare Book Collection.

== Gallery ==
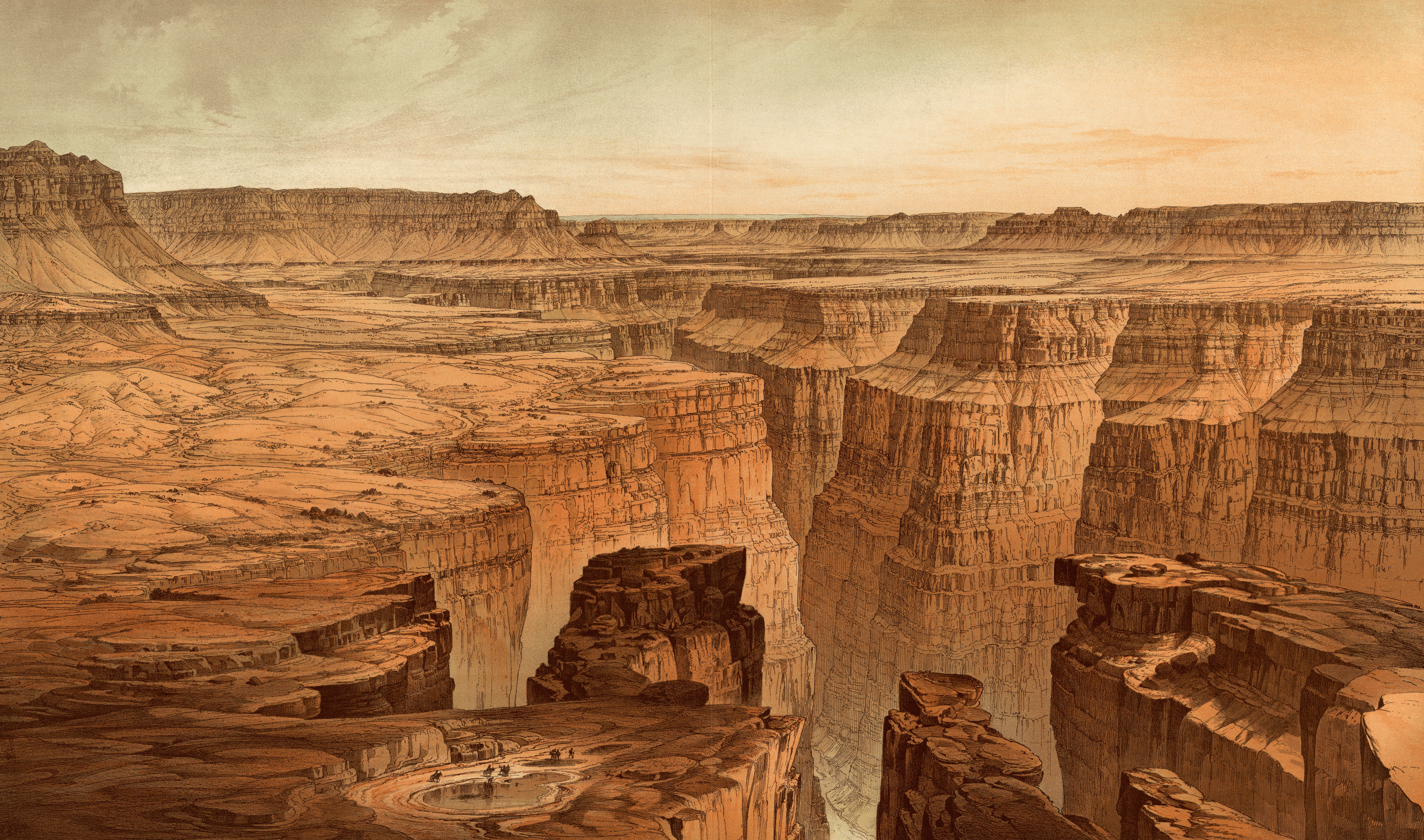
Grand Canyon at the foot of the Toroweap - looking east, sheet VI, in Clarence E. Dutton, The Tertiary History of the Grand Cañon District (Holmes, 1882)

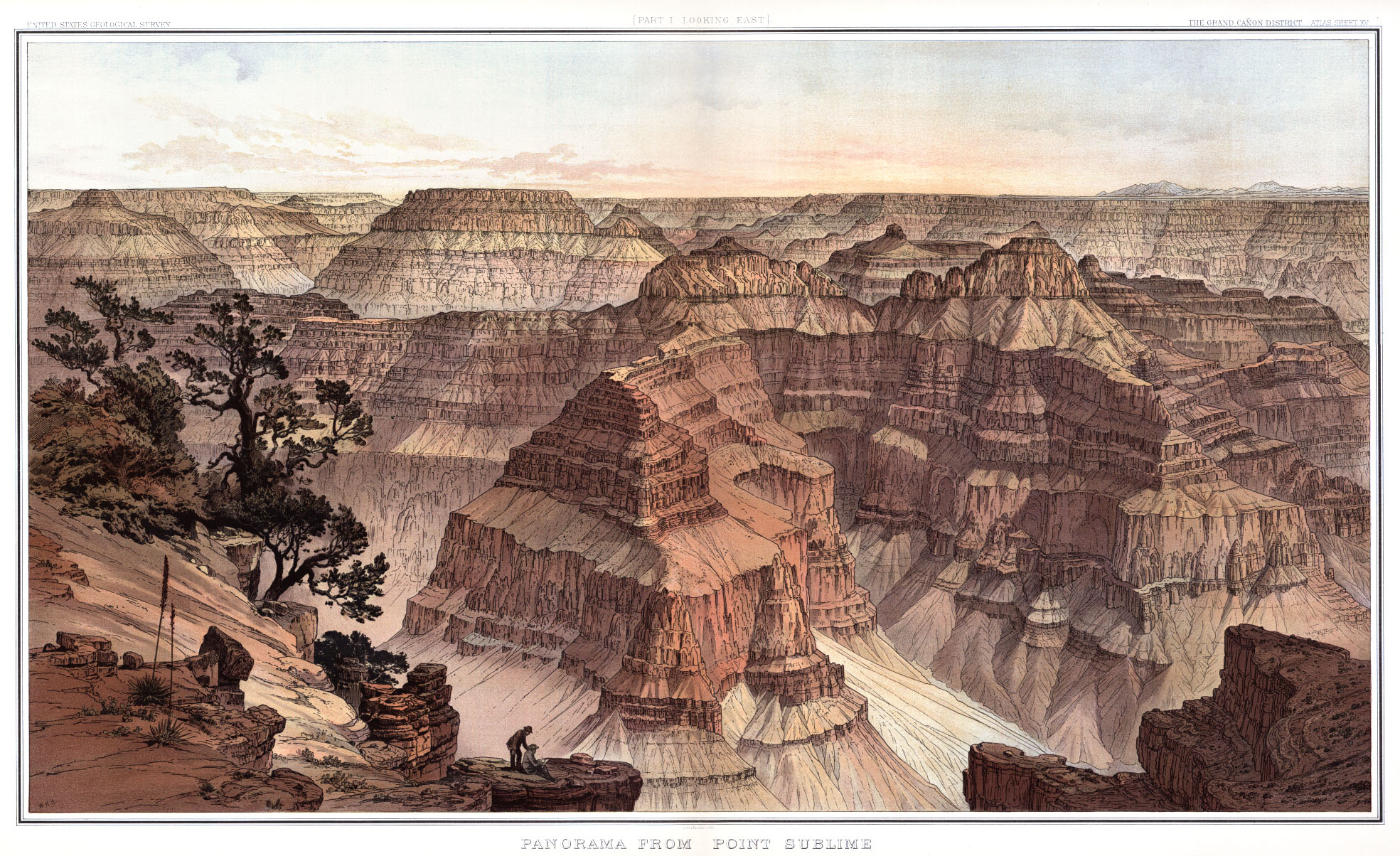
Panorama from Point Sublime, illustration of the Grand Canyon by Holmes, published in Clarence E. Dutton, The Tertiary History of the Grand Cañon District (1882), sheet XV.

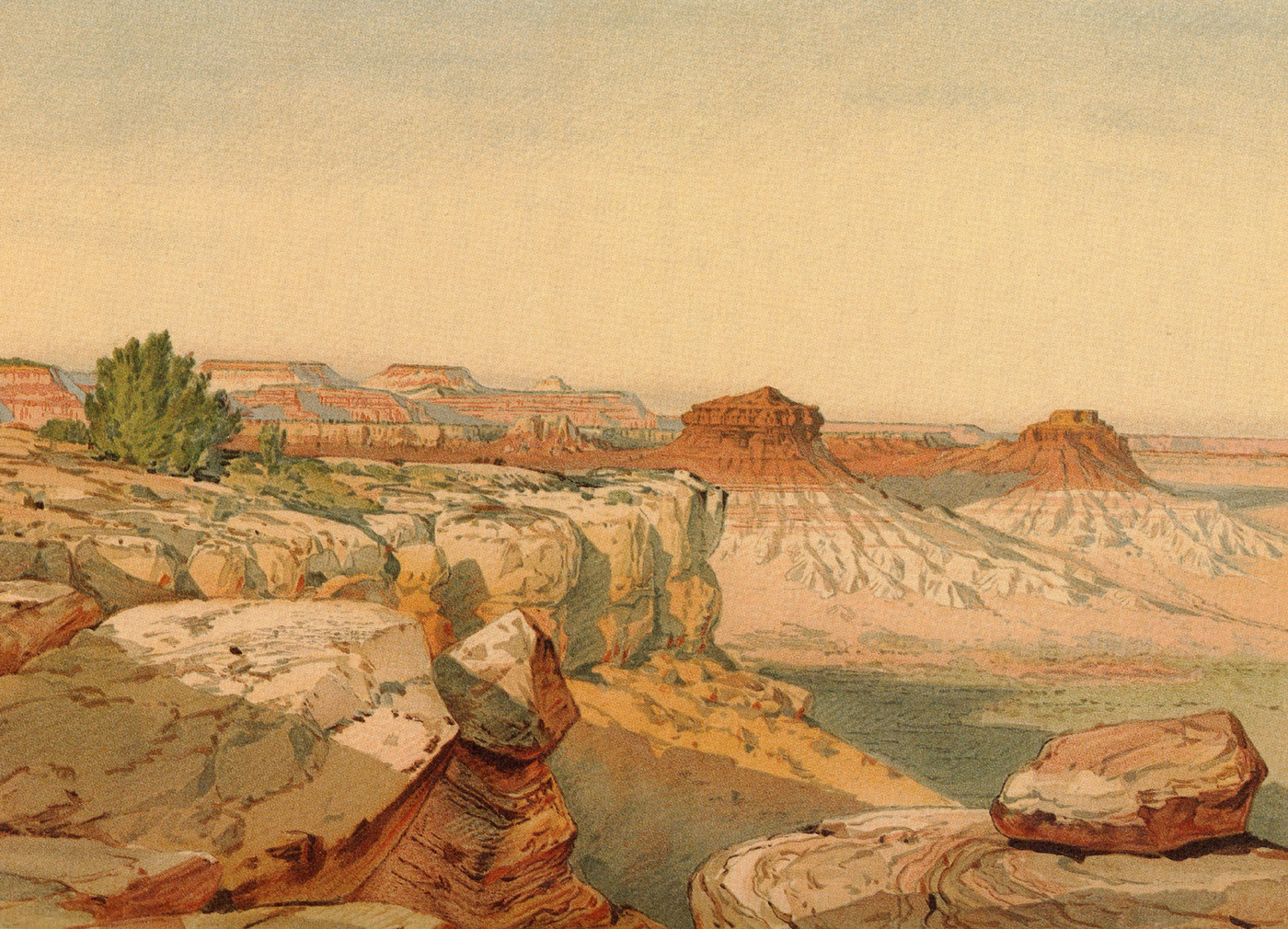
Sunset on the Kanab Desert. From the brink of the Permian Cliff - a Permian butte in the foreground, the Vermillion Cliffs in the distance, and the Jurassic white sandstone in the extreme background. Grand Canyon District, Mohave County, Arizona. (Holmes, 1877)

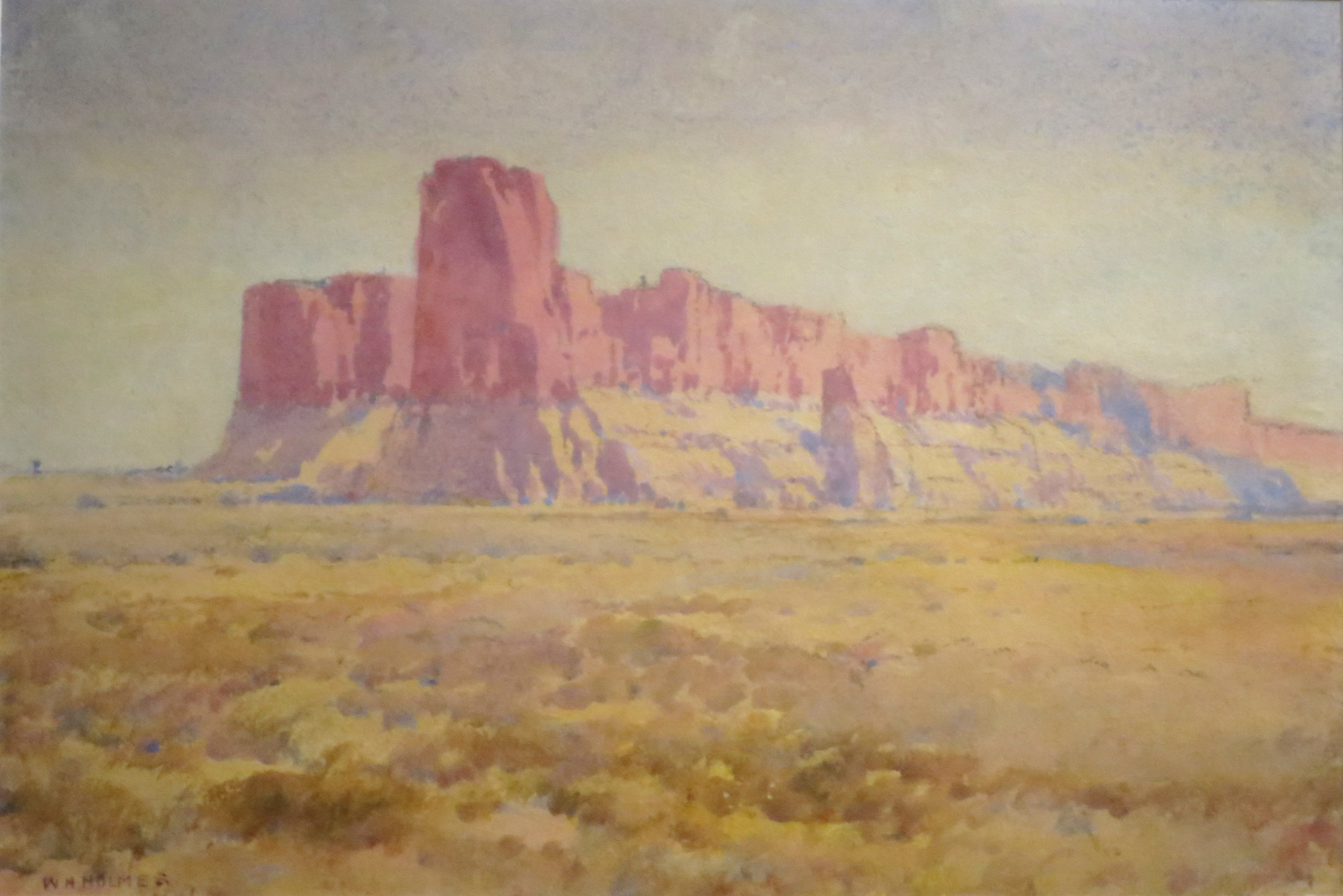
Mesa Encantada (Holmes, 1914)

== Secondary sources ==
- Fernlund, Kevin J. (2000). William Henry Holmes and the Rediscovery of the American West. Albuquerque: University of New Mexico Press. ISBN 978-0-8263-2127-5.
- Gleach, Frederic W. (2002). "William Henry Holmes, 1909–1910". In Regna Darnell; Frederic W. Gleach (eds.). Celebrating a Century of the American Anthropological Association: Presidential Portraits. Arlington, VA: American Anthropological Association; Lincoln: University of Nebraska Press. pp. 13–15. ISBN 978-0-8032-1720-1. OCLC 49225637.
- Goetzmann, William H. (1966). Exploration and Empire: The Role of the Explorer and Scientist in the Exploration and Development of the American West, 1800–1900. New York: Alfred Knopf. OCLC 760599995.
- Hough, Walter (October–December 1933). "William Henry Holmes". American Anthropologist. New Series. 35 (4). Arlington, VA: American Anthropological Association and affiliated societies: 752–764. doi:10.1525/aa.1933.35.4.02a00110. ISSN 0002-7294. OCLC 1479294.
- Nelson, Clifford. William Henry Holmes: Beginning a Career in Art and Science. Records of the Columbia Historical Society, Washington, D.C. 50 (1980): 252–78
- Wallace Stegner. (1954). Beyond the Hundredth Meridian: John Wesley Powell and the Second Opening of the American West. New York: Houghton Mifflin.
- Swanton, John R. (1936). "Biographical Memoir of William Henry Holmes, 1846–1933" (PDF). Biographical Memoirs of the National Academy of Sciences. Vol. 17. Bibliography compiled by Ella Leary (Tenth Memoir: Presented to the Academy at the Autumn meeting, 1935. ed.). Washington, DC: National Academy of Sciences. ISSN 0077-2933. OCLC 37424036.
- Willey, Gordon R.; Meltzer, David J.; Dunnell, Robert C. (Spring 1994). "[Review of] The Archaeology of William Henry Holmes by David J. Meltzer; Robert C. Dunnell". Journal of Field Archaeology. 21 (1). Boston, MA: Association for Field Archaeology, Boston University: 119–123. doi:10.2307/530250. ISSN 0093-4690. JSTOR 530250. OCLC 8560818.
