= Holm =

Holm may refer to:

== Places ==
- Holm (island), the name of several islands
- Holm, Nordfriesland, Germany
- Holm, Pinneberg, Germany
- Holm (Flensburg), Flensburg, Germany
- Holm, Nordland, a village in Bindal Municipality in Nordland county, Norway
- Holm, Troms, a village in Dyrøy Municipality in Troms county, Norway
- Holm, Podu Iloaiei, Iași County, Romania
- Holm, Pâncești, Romania
- Holm, Inverness, Scotland
- Holm, Lewis, Scotland
- Holm, Orkney, Scotland
- Holm, Halmstad, Sweden
- Mount Saint Mary, formerly known as Holm, Slovenia
- Holm Land, King Frederick VIII Land, Greenland

== Other ==
- Holm (surname)
- Holm & Co, former ship owners, ship brokers and stevedores based in Wellington, New Zealand
- Holm & Molzen, former German company principally known for ship management between 1890 and 1932
- Holm Oak or Quercus ilex, a tree. Also found as a placename element in southern England such as Holmbush

== See also ==
- Holme (disambiguation)
- Holmen (disambiguation)
- Holmes (disambiguation)
- -hou, a place-name element
