= Rose Farm =

Rose Farm may refer to:

in the United States

- Rose Farm, Ohio
- Rose Farm, also known as the William L. Holmes House, Oregon City, Oregon
