= Pâncești =

Pânceşti or Pănceşti may refer to several places in Romania:

- Pâncești, Bacău, a commune in Bacău County
- Pâncești, Neamț, a commune in Neamţ County
- Pănceşti, a village in Sascut Commune, Bacău County
