= Kinyanjui =

Kinyanjui is a surname of Kenyan origin. Notable people with the surname include:

- Arthur Kinyanjui Magugu (1934–2012), Kenyan politician
- Kui Kinyanjui, Kenyan reporter
- Lee Kinyanjui (born 1972), Kenyan politician
- Nephat Kinyanjui (born 1977), Kenyan long-distance runner
- Kinyanjui Kombani (born 1981), Kenyan author
