= Indian Cave Petroglyphs =

Indian Cave Petroglyphs may refer to:

- Indian Cave Petroglyphs (Tennessee), listed on the National Register of Historic Places near Onward in White County, Tennessee
- Indian Cave Petroglyphs (West Virginia), listed on the National Register of Historic Places in Harrison County, West Virginia
