= Madeira School =

Private girls school in Virginia, US

The Madeira School

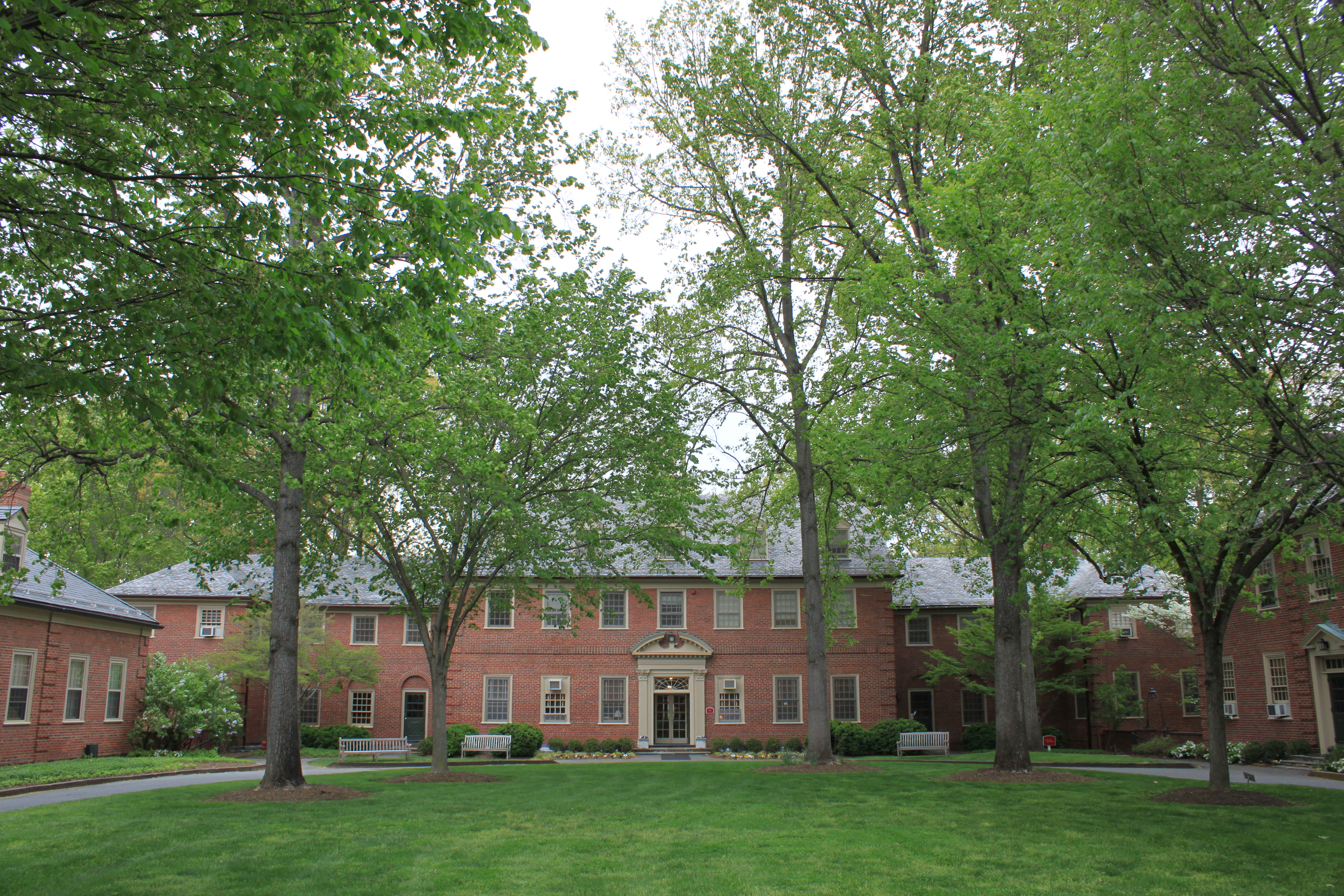
- Oval and Main building

Location
- 8328 Georgetown Pike; McLean, Virginia 22102; United States; 38°57′55″N 77°14′6″W

Information
- Other names: Madeira School; Madeira
- Type: Private, day and boarding college-preparatory school
- Motto: Latin: Festina lente (Make haste slowly)
- Established: 1906
- Founder: Lucy Madeira Wing
- NCES School ID: 02063874
- Head of school: Christina Kyong
- Teaching staff: 50.3 (on an FTE basis)
- Grades: 9–12
- Gender: Girls
- Enrollment: 321 (2017–2018)
- Student to teacher ratio: 6.4
- Campus size: 376 acres (1.52 km^{2})
- Campus type: Fringe rural
- Colors: Red and White
- Mascot: Snail
- Website: www.madeira.org

The Madeira School (simply referred to as Madeira School or Madeira) is an elite, private, day and boarding college-preparatory school for girls in McLean, Virginia, United States. It was established in 1906 by Lucy Madeira Wing.

== History ==
The school was founded in 1906 by Lucy Madeira Wing (1873–1961) on 19th Street near Dupont Circle in Washington, D.C. In 1931, it moved some 12 miles west to the Northern Virginia suburb of Greenway, Virginia, which was later renamed McLean.

== Events ==
In 1973, the body of 14-year-old student Natalia Semler was found bound and beaten on the school grounds. John Gilreath, who had been convicted of a sexual assault at the school two years earlier, was convicted of her murder.

In 1980, then-headmistress Jean Harris was convicted of the murder of Herman Tarnower.

== Demographics ==
The demographic breakdown of the 334 girls enrolled in 2021–2022 was:

- American Indian/Alaska Native - 0
- Asian - 75
- Black - 40
- Hispanic - 30
- Native Hawaiian/Pacific Islander - 1
- White - 157
- Two or More Races - 31

== Campus and facilities ==
The campus is on 376 acres (1.52 km^{2}) overlooking the Potomac River (McLean, Virginia) and consists of 34 separate buildings.

Original buildings on the 1931 campus include Main, the dining hall, Schoolhouse, East, West, North, and South Dorms, the Land, the Annex (infirmary), and the two gatehouses at the entrance to the Oval. Buildings added later include the Chapel/Auditorium, the indoor riding ring and Gaines Hall, the science building, a renovated and expanded dining hall, Hurd Sports Center, and Huffington Library.

=== Public access ===
The Madeira school has had many disputes over the use of its land. In 1966, Fairfax County proposed to turn 208 of Madeira's 376 acres (1.52 km^{2}) into public parkland. In 1991, Madeira gave a trail easement along Georgetown Pike and $89,000 for construction so that hikers could walk the Potomac Heritage Route without entering the main area of the campus. However, this trail was never completed by the park officials. In 2008, the Fairfax County government attempted to obtain from Madeira an easement near the Potomac River to permit the completion of a 100-mile (160 km) loop of walking trails as a condition of approval for the school's proposed expansion plans. This one-mile (1.6 km)-long trail section through Madeira's property would connect the county's Scott's Run Park to Great Falls National Park. The Madeira School declined this easement, citing concerns about safety and environmental impacts.

== Notable alumnae ==
- Zach Barack, actor and singer
- Mary Lincoln Beckwith, descendant of Abraham Lincoln
- Stephania Bell, physical therapist and commentator
- Christina Bellin, model and socialite
- Blair Brown, actress
- Campbell Brown, anchor and news reporter
- Mika Brzezinski, journalist, talk show host, commentator, and author
- Janelle Bynum, member of the House of Representatives
- Charlotte E. Carr, labor activist and state official
- Stockard Channing, actress
- Penny Chenery, sportswoman
- Julia Collins, most successful female Jeopardy! contestant
- Hope Cooke, Queen consort of the 12th Chogyal of Sikkim
- Kathryn Wasserman Davis, philanthropist and scholar of world affairs
- Helen T. Edwards, physicist
- Katharine Graham, publisher
- Mary Helen Wright Greuter, astronomer and historian
- Lois Cowles Harrison, civic leader, women's rights activist, and philanthropist
- Cornelia Stuyvesant Vanderbilt, heiress
- Rory Kennedy, documentary filmmaker
- Kui Kinyanjui, journalist
- Alex Kuczynski, author and journalist
- Eleanor de Laittre, artist
- Clara López, former Colombian minister of labour
- Diana Oughton, social activist
- Patricia Phelps de Cisneros, art collector and philanthropist
- Naomi Pierce, evolutionary biologist
- Martha Reeves (anchorite), Anglican solitary and author
- Alice Rivlin, economist and budget official
- Carrie Southworth, actress and model
- Frances Sternhagen, actress
- Ruth Carter Stevenson, patron of the arts
- Lally Weymouth, journalist
- Meredith Whitney, businesswoman

== Notable faculty ==
- Kate Clifton Osgood Holmes, painter
- Anne Truitt, sculptor and author
