= McClary Ridge =

McClary Ridge (66°55′S 64°9′W) is a small, crescent-shaped ridge 5 nautical miles (9 km) south-southeast of Mount Hayes on the south side of Cole Peninsula in Graham Land, Antarctica. In December 1947 it was charted by the Falkland Islands Dependencies Survey and was photographed from the air by the Ronne Antarctic Research Expedition under Finn Ronne. It was named by Ronne for George B. McClary of Winnetka, Illinois, a contributor to the expedition.
