= Indian Cave Petroglyphs (West Virginia) =

- U.S. National Register of Historic Places
- Nearest city: Good Hope, West Virginia
- Area: 1 acre (0.40 ha)
- NRHP reference No.: 76001937
- Added to NRHP: March 16, 1976

Indian Cave Petroglyphs is a historic archaeological site located near Good Hope, Harrison County, West Virginia. It consists of petroglyphs occupying an area of 20 feet by 4 feet on the back wall of a rockshelter. These artifacts were first reported by archaeologist William Henry Holmes (1846-1933) of the Bureau of American Ethnology who visited the area in 1889. He also found pottery that indicates an occupation or occupations between 500 and 1675.

The Indian Cave Petroglyphs were again studied by archaeologist James L. Swauger in 1970 and were listed as an archaeological site on the National Register of Historic Places in 1976.

== See also ==
- Prehistory of West Virginia
