= Long Lake (Thurston County, Washington) =

Lake in Thurston County, Washington, United States

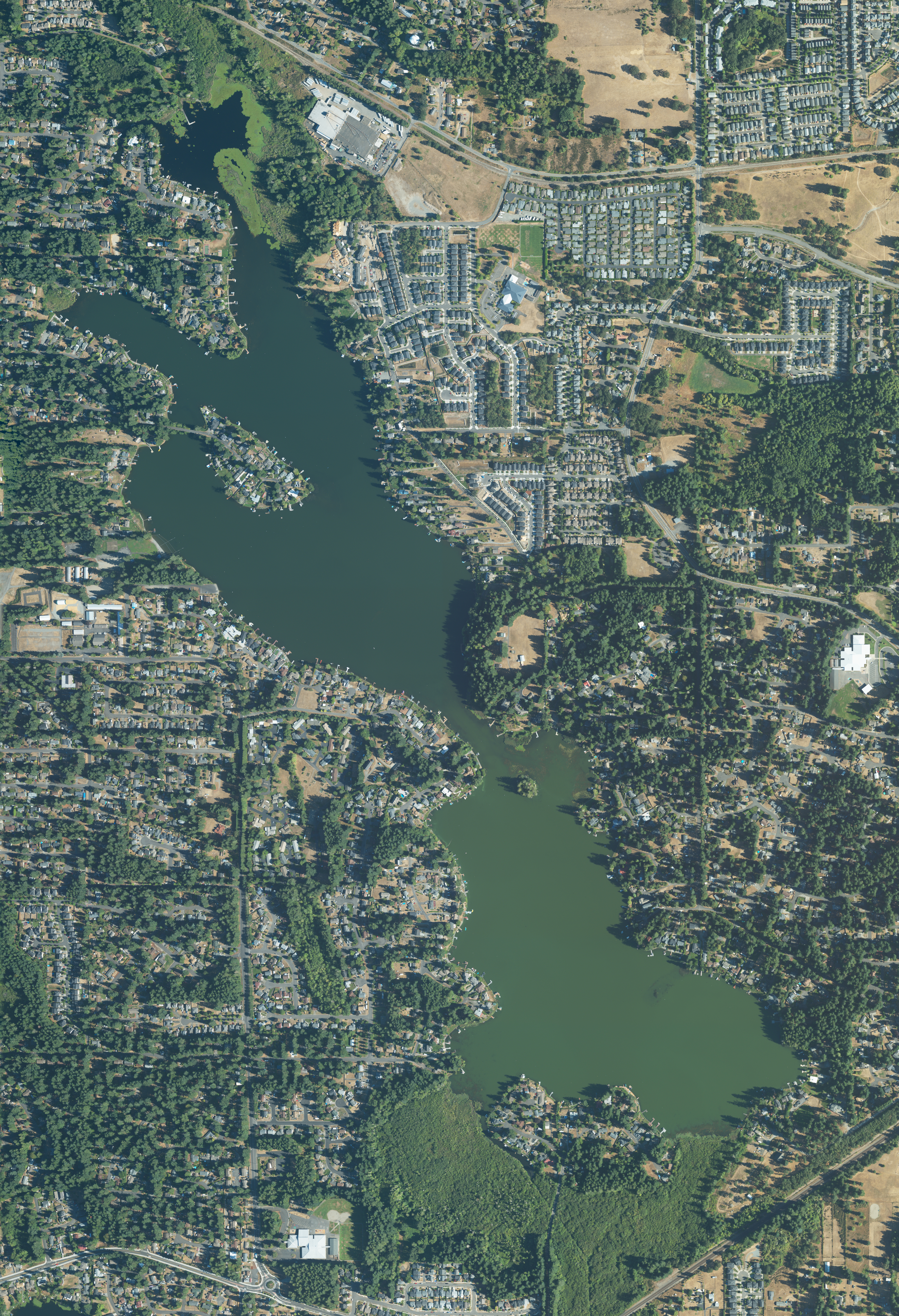
- Long Lake in August 2023
- Location: Thurston County, Washington
- Coordinates: 47°01′05″N 122°46′22″W
- Basin countries: United States
- Surface elevation: 161 ft (49 m)

Long Lake is a freshwater lake located in Thurston County, Washington, United States. It is located approximately 5.5 miles (8.9 km) east of Olympia. It consists of two basins connected by a narrow neck. It is two miles (3.2 km) long and has two islands, Holmes Island (13 acres / 5.3 ha) and Kirby Island (2.4 acres / 1 ha). Long Lake is fed by Pattison Lake and drains via Himes/Woodland Creek and Lois Lake to Henderson Inlet. Long Lake was given its descriptive name in 1853.

== Recreation ==
=== Boat launch ===
The lake can be accessed via a Washington State Department of Fish and Wildlife (WDFW) boat launch. The launch is open during fishing season and requires a WDFW vehicle use permit. Thurston County establishes regulations regarding boating operations and water safety on Long Lake.

=== Long Lake Park ===
Long Lake Park is a 10-acre (4 ha) park operated by the City of Lacey which features a swimming beach, sand-volleyball courts, and barbecue facilities. The park has 285 feet (87 m) of beach frontage as well as picnic facilities and pedestrian trails through the woods. The city calls the swimming beach one of the finest in Thurston County. The park is open from 7 am to dusk.

In May 2025, swimmer's itch was reported at the lake, prompting Thurston County to issue a public advisory to avoid swimming there.

=== Fishing ===
In 2014, Long Lake was added to the WDFW list of lakes open for year-round fishing. The following species of fish can be found in Long Lake:

- Largemouth bass
- Rock bass
- Bluegill
- Brown bullhead
- Eurasian carp
- Yellow perch
- Pumpkinseed
- Suckerfish
- Coastal cutthroat trout
- Rainbow trout
- Warmouth

=== Polar Bear Plunge ===
Each year on New Year's Day, Long Lake Park hosts the Polar Bear Plunge where hundreds ring in the new year by jumping into the lake.

== Lake Management District ==
Since 1987, Long Lake property owners have authorized Lake Management District No. 19 to oversee the management of the lake. The District was authorized for January 1, 2011 to December 31, 2015.

With attention to habitat, recreation, and watershed concerns, the district monitors and manages any recurrence of milfoil or the emergence of other aquatic plants. The association also monitors the lake for phosphorus loading and water quality, as well as population and recreational impacts on Long Lake.

== See also ==
- List of geographic features in Thurston County, Washington
