= Holme =

Holme may refer to:

== People ==
- Holme (surname)

== Music ==
- Holme (band)

== Places ==
=== Antarctica ===
- Holme Bay

=== Denmark ===
- Holme, Aarhus

=== England ===
- Holme, Bedfordshire
- Holme, Cambridgeshire
- Holme, Cumbria
- Holme, North Lincolnshire, Lincolnshire
- Holme, North Yorkshire
- Holme, Nottinghamshire
- Holme Chapel, Lancashire
- Holme, West Lindsey, Lincolnshire
- Holme, West Yorkshire
- Holme Fell, Cumbria
- Holme Island, a small tidal island off Grange-over-Sands, Cumbria
- Holme Valley, West Yorkshire
- Holme-next-the-Sea
- Holme-on-Spalding-Moor
- Holme on the Wolds
- Holme Moss
- The Holme, one of the villas in Regent's Park, London
- River Holme

=== Latvia ===
- Holme, former German name of Mārtiņsala

=== Norway ===
- Holme, Vestland, a village in Alver Municipality in Vestland county
- Holme Municipality, a former municipality in the old Lister og Mandal county

== See also ==
- East Holme
- West Holme
- Holm (disambiguation)
- Holmes (disambiguation)
