= National Register of Historic Places listings in Pike County, Mississippi =

Location of Pike County in Mississippi

This is a list of the National Register of Historic Places listings in Pike County, Mississippi.

This is intended to be a complete list of the properties and districts on the National Register of Historic Places in Pike County, Mississippi, United States. Latitude and longitude coordinates are provided for many National Register properties and districts; these locations may be seen together in a map.

There are 29 properties and districts listed on the National Register in the county. Another property was once listed but has been removed.

This National Park Service list is complete through NPS recent listings posted March 14, 2025.

== Current listings ==
	Name on the Register	Image	Date listed	Location	City or town	Description
1	The Annex		October 11, 1984 (#84000036)	225 Magnolia St. 31°08′41″N 90°27′31″W	Magnolia	
2	Bank of Summit		July 7, 1983 (#83000965)	811 Robb St. 31°17′00″N 90°28′02″W	Summit	
3	Berryhill House		October 11, 1984 (#84000038)	265 W. Railroad Ave. 31°08′44″N 90°27′28″W	Magnolia	
4	Brentwood		March 9, 1989 (#89000170)	601 Delaware Ave. 31°14′42″N 90°26′51″W	McComb	
5	Buie Building		October 11, 1984 (#84000040)	110 E. Railroad Ave. 31°08′37″N 90°27′27″W	Magnolia	
6	Burglund Heights		February 9, 2024 (#100009940)	220 Maddock. 222 Maddock, 302 Maddock, 304 Maddock, 118 West Alley, 112 West Alley, 211 St. Augustine, 213 St. Augustine, 303 St. Augustine, 305 St. Augustine, 111 East Alley, and 117 East Alley; 31°15′27″N 90°27′09″W	McComb	
7	Carraway House		October 11, 1984 (#84000041)	420 N. Clark St. 31°08′54″N 90°27′33″W	Magnolia	
8	George Chadwick House	George Chadwick House	October 11, 1984 (#84000043)	560 N. Cherry St. 31°08′57″N 90°27′25″W	Magnolia	
9	Depot	Depot	October 11, 1984 (#84000045)	101 E. Railroad Ave. 31°08′38″N 90°27′28″W	Magnolia	
10	Phillip Henry Enochs House		March 20, 2002 (#02000208)	1001 Dogwood Dr. 31°10′49″N 90°26′48″W	Fernwood	
11	Everette-Gottig-Bilbo House		October 11, 1984 (#84000046)	109 E. Myrtle St. 31°08′49″N 90°27′35″W	Magnolia	
12	Holmes House		October 11, 1984 (#84000048)	405 N. Cherry St. 31°08′52″N 90°27′30″W	Magnolia	
13	William Frederick Holmes House	William Frederick Holmes House	March 22, 2004 (#04000216)	302 3rd St. 31°14′30″N 90°27′18″W	McComb	
14	Holmesville Historic DistrictHolmesville Historic District		March 13, 2025 (#100011512)	Roughly Bounded by Madison Street to the north, Tennessee Street to the west, the Bogue Chitto River to the east, and Pike 93 Central Highway to the south 31°12′17″N 90°18′31″W	Holmesville	
15	Kramertown-Railroad Historic District		March 13, 1980 (#80002301)	S. Railroad Boulevard; 31°14′29″N 90°26′59″W	McComb	
16	Lanier House		October 11, 1984 (#84000049)	400 N. Clark St. 31°08′52″N 90°27′34″W	Magnolia	
17	Magnolia Manor	Magnolia Manor	September 9, 1983 (#83000966)	3rd and Amite Sts. 31°00′17″N 90°28′31″W	Osyka	
18	McComb Downtown Historic District		April 14, 2004 (#04000279)	Roughly bounded by Broadway, State, Front, and Canal Sts. 31°14′37″N 90°27′10″W	McComb	
19	Mullendore House		October 11, 1984 (#84000052)	515 N. Cherry St. 31°08′56″N 90°27′28″W	Magnolia	
20	Myrtle Street Historic District		October 11, 1984 (#84000054)	W. Myrtle St. between N. Clark and N. Prewitt Sts. 31°08′49″N 90°27′39″W	Magnolia	
21	Norwood-TWL Building		October 11, 1984 (#84000055)	131 W. Railroad Ave. 31°08′38″N 90°27′31″W	Magnolia	
22	Simmons House		October 11, 1984 (#84000057)	489 Prewitt St. 31°08′58″N 90°27′39″W	Magnolia	
23	Southtown Historic District	Southtown Historic District	October 11, 1984 (#84000059)	Roughly bounded by Minnehaha Creek, the Illinois Central railroad tracks, and Bay, Laurel, and Prewitt Sts. 31°08′32″N 90°27′41″W	Magnolia	
24	Spinks Plantation		November 14, 2007 (#07001183)	½ mile north of the junction of Muddy Springs and Irene Rds. 31°09′06″N 90°32′18″W	Magnolia	
25	States Area Neighborhood Historic District		September 10, 2014 (#14000571)	Roughly bounded by Delaware, Louisiana, Pennsylvania & 5th Aves., 3rs & 21st Sts., Broadway, Hollywood Cemetery; 31°14′38″N 90°27′34″W	McComb	
26	Stogner House		October 11, 1984 (#84000068)	550 N. Cherry St. 31°08′56″N 90°27′26″W	Magnolia	
27	Tanglewood		August 23, 1991 (#91001102)	County Road 468, 1 mile north of Mississippi Highway 48; 31°08′02″N 90°22′44″W	Magnolia	
28	US Post Office-Magnolia		March 18, 1993 (#80004885)	205 Magnolia St. 31°08′42″N 90°27′31″W	Magnolia	
29	White-Alford House	White-Alford House	April 21, 1983 (#83000967)	845 White Boulevard; 31°13′52″N 90°26′17″W	McComb	

== Former listing ==
	Name on the Register	Image	Date listed	Date removed	Location	City or town	Description
1	Lieb-Rawls House		October 11, 1984 (#84000051)	August 7, 2002	303 Magnolia Street	Magnolia	Destroyed by fire in February 2000.

== See also ==
- List of National Historic Landmarks in Mississippi
- National Register of Historic Places listings in Mississippi
