= Magnolia station =

- The Depot
- U.S. National Register of Historic Places
- Mississippi Landmark
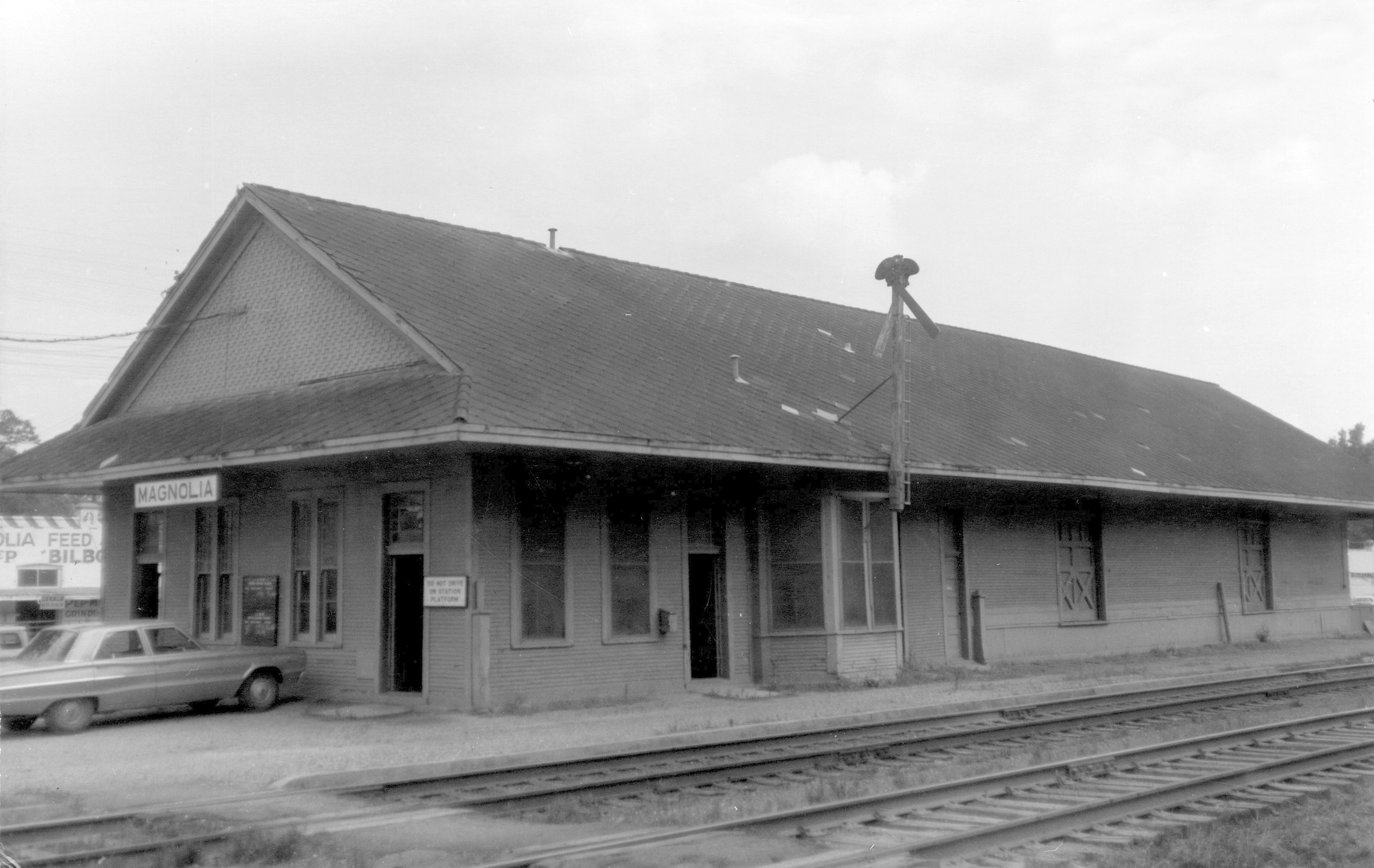
- Magnolia Depot, circa 1960s

- Location within Mississippi Location within the United States
- Location: 101 E. Railroad Avenue; Magnolia, Mississippi
- Coordinates: 31°8′38″N 90°27′28″W
- Area: less than one acre
- Built: c. 1895
- Architectural style: Queen Anne
- MPS
- NRHP reference No.: 84000045
- USMS No.: 113-MAG-0201-NR-ML

Significant dates
- Added to NRHP: October 11, 1984
- Designated USMS: September 14, 2006

Magnolia station is a historic railway station located at 101 E. Railroad Avenue, in Magnolia, Mississippi. The depot was placed on the National Register of Historic Places in 1984 as The Depot and was designated a Mississippi Landmark in 2006.

== Description ==
In 1851, Abraham Lincoln and Stephen Douglas both supported the funding for the New Orleans, Jackson, and Great Northern railroad that was to connect Canton, Mississippi to New Orleans, Louisiana. This plan would ultimately include a stop and depot at Magnolia, Mississippi. The first depot in Magnolia, Mississippi, built in 1856, was one of only three depots on the New Orleans, Jackson, and Great Northern to survive the Civil War. In 1893 a fire destroyed this Magnolia railway depot that was completed during the President Franklin Pierce administration in 1856. Between 1893 and 1895, the present structure was built a little north of the original site, next to the Illinois Central Railroad. The second depot featured a front gable and the name of the town (Magnolia) painted on the roof. In the 1920s, the Illinois Central Railroad paid for additions and renovations. The front gable was taken in by the roof and the north waiting rooms expanded and enlarged, with other significant alterations to the structure occurring on the south part as well.

The depot is a one-story, wood-frame building with a rectangular floor plan. It was designed to accommodate both freight and passengers at the turn of the 20th century, when Magnolia served as a resort destination. The depot has a gable roof design with wide eaves. The track side of the building was designed with irregular placement of sash windows, a bay window, single entrance doors, and freight doors. The opposite side of the building had single entrance doors and sash windows.

== Restoration ==
By 1982, the building was used as an antique store and no longer served as a railway station. During the first decade of the 21st century, the City of Magnolia acquired the property for use as a city hall. Because of the structure's age and deterioration of the foundation, complete exterior restoration was required, but the original windows and siding were retained for historical integrity. New exterior doors were installed, and the freight doors were removed and were replaced with windows. For the interior, original doors, wood flooring, and beadboard walls were retained and restored. Renovation also included new plumbing and electrical wiring.

Grants for restoration were provided by Mississippi Department of Archives and History and the Mississippi Department of Transportation. Restoration was completed in 2011. The structure serves as Magnolia's City Hall.

| Preceding station | Illinois Central Railroad | Following station |
|---|---|---|
| Chatawa toward New Orleans | Main Line | Fernwood toward Chicago |
