= Poienari =

- Commune
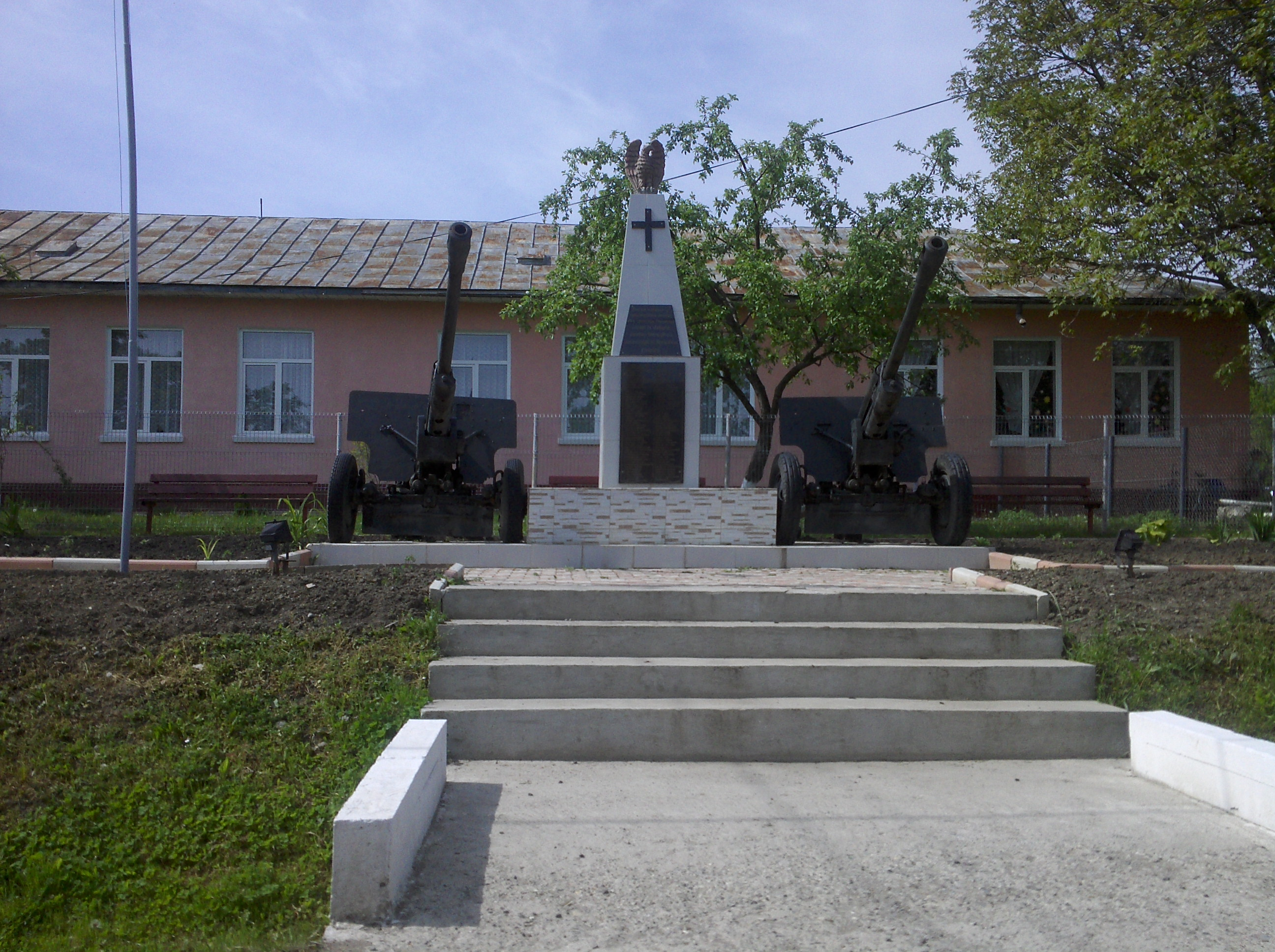
- Heroes' monument in Poienari

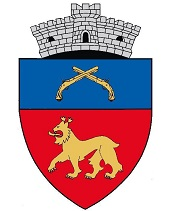
- Coat of arms

- Location in Neamț County

- Location in Romania
- Coordinates: 46°53′N 27°7′E
- Country: Romania
- County: Neamț
- Subdivisions: Poienari, Bunghi, Săcăleni

Government
  - Mayor (2024–2028): Vasile-Emil Dascălu (PSD)
- Area: 36 km^{2} (14 sq mi)
- Elevation: 244 m (801 ft)
- Population (2021-12-01): 1,374
  - Density: 38/km^{2} (99/sq mi)
- Time zone: UTC+02:00 (EET)
  - Summer (DST): UTC+03:00 (EEST)
- Postal code: 617360
- Area code: +40 x33
- Vehicle reg.: NT
- Website: www.comunapoienari.ro

Poienari is a commune in Neamț County, Western Moldavia, Romania. It is composed of three villages: Bunghi, Poienari, and Săcăleni. It included five other villages until 2004, when they were split off to form Pâncești Commune.

Historical population
Year	Pop.	±%
2002	1,713	—
2011	1,453	−15.2%
2021	1,374	−5.4%
Source: Census data
