= Kate Clifton Osgood Holmes =

American painter

- Born: 1 October 1858; Castine, Maine
- Died: April 19, 1925 (aged 66)
- Education: Art Students League of New York
- Known for: painting

Kate Clifton Osgood Holmes (October 1, 1858 – April 19, 1925) was an American painter and scientific illustrator.

== Life ==
Kate Clifton Osgood Holmes was born in Castine, Maine, October 1, 1858. She was one of five children born to James Blake Osgood and Cornelia Adams Upham.She moved with her family to Ellsworth by the age of two; some sources list Ellsworth as her birthplace, and indeed she herself gave it as such on a passport application in 1908. They moved again, to Washington, D.C., around 1862.

She studied at the Art Students League of New York, under William Merritt Chase. In 1883, she married Dr. William Henry Holmes. She studied in Europe for a year before returning to the United States; she taught decorative arts in local schools around Washington, including the Madeira School, for a number of years thereafter. She lectured a great deal as well. She was employed by the Bureau of Ethnology of the Smithsonian Institution from 1881 to 1883, and remained active with the Smithsonian for much of her career. Holmes died in Washington, D.C. One of her paintings, Summer, and a drawing of a priest are currently in the collection of the Smithsonian American Art Museum.
