= Sedberry-Holmes House =

Historic house in North Carolina, United States

- U.S. National Register of Historic Places
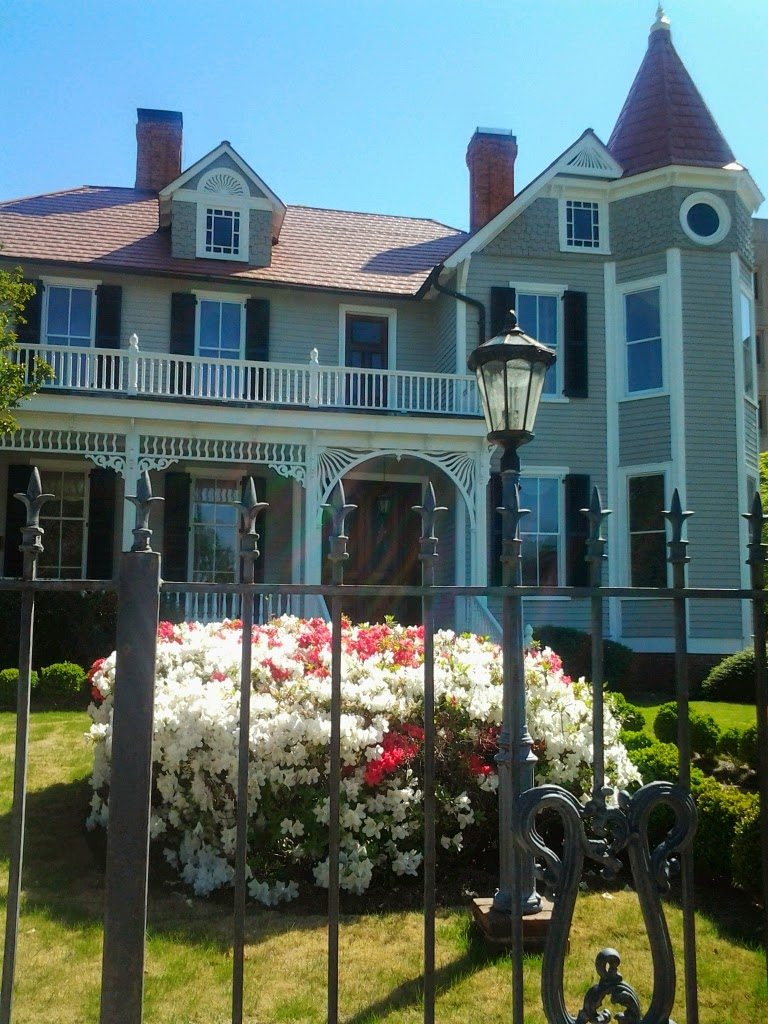
- Sedberry-Holmes House, April 2014

- Location within North Carolina Location within the United States
- Location: 232 Person St., Fayetteville, North Carolina
- Coordinates: 35°3′4″N 78°52′33″W
- Area: 1 acre (0.40 ha)
- Built: 1886
- Architectural style: Queen Anne
- NRHP reference No.: 75001252
- Added to NRHP: September 2, 1975

Sedberry-Holmes House is a historic home located at Fayetteville, Cumberland County, North Carolina. It was built in 1886, and is a two-story, five bay by three bay, Queen Anne style frame dwelling. It has a two-story gabled projection with an attached corner turret. It features a steep gable roof and wraparound porch.

It was listed on the National Register of Historic Places in 1973.
