= USS Holmes =

USS Holmes has been the name of more than one United States Navy ship, and may refer to:

- USS Holmes (PF-81), a patrol frigate transferred to the United Kingdom while under construction and in service in the Royal Navy as the frigate HMS Tobago (K585) from 1944 to 1945
- USS Holmes (DE-572), a destroyer escort transferred to the United Kingdom which served in the Royal Navy as the frigate HMS Holmes (K581) from 1944 to 1945
