= Mount Holmes (Antarctica) =

Mountain in Graham Land, Antarctica

Coordinates: 66°47′S 64°16′W

Mount Holmes is a buttress-type mountain, 1,440 metres (4,720 ft), standing 3 nautical miles (6 km; 3 mi) northwest of Mount Hayes on the east coast of Graham Land, Antarctica. It was charted in 1947 by the Falkland Islands Dependencies Survey (FIDS), and photographed from the air by the Ronne Antarctic Research Expedition (RARE) under Finn Ronne. The mountain was named by the FIDS for Maurice Holmes, author of An Introduction to the Bibliography of Captain James Cook R.N. (London, 1936).
