= Perrigo-Holmes House =

Historic house in Iowa, United States

- U.S. National Register of Historic Places
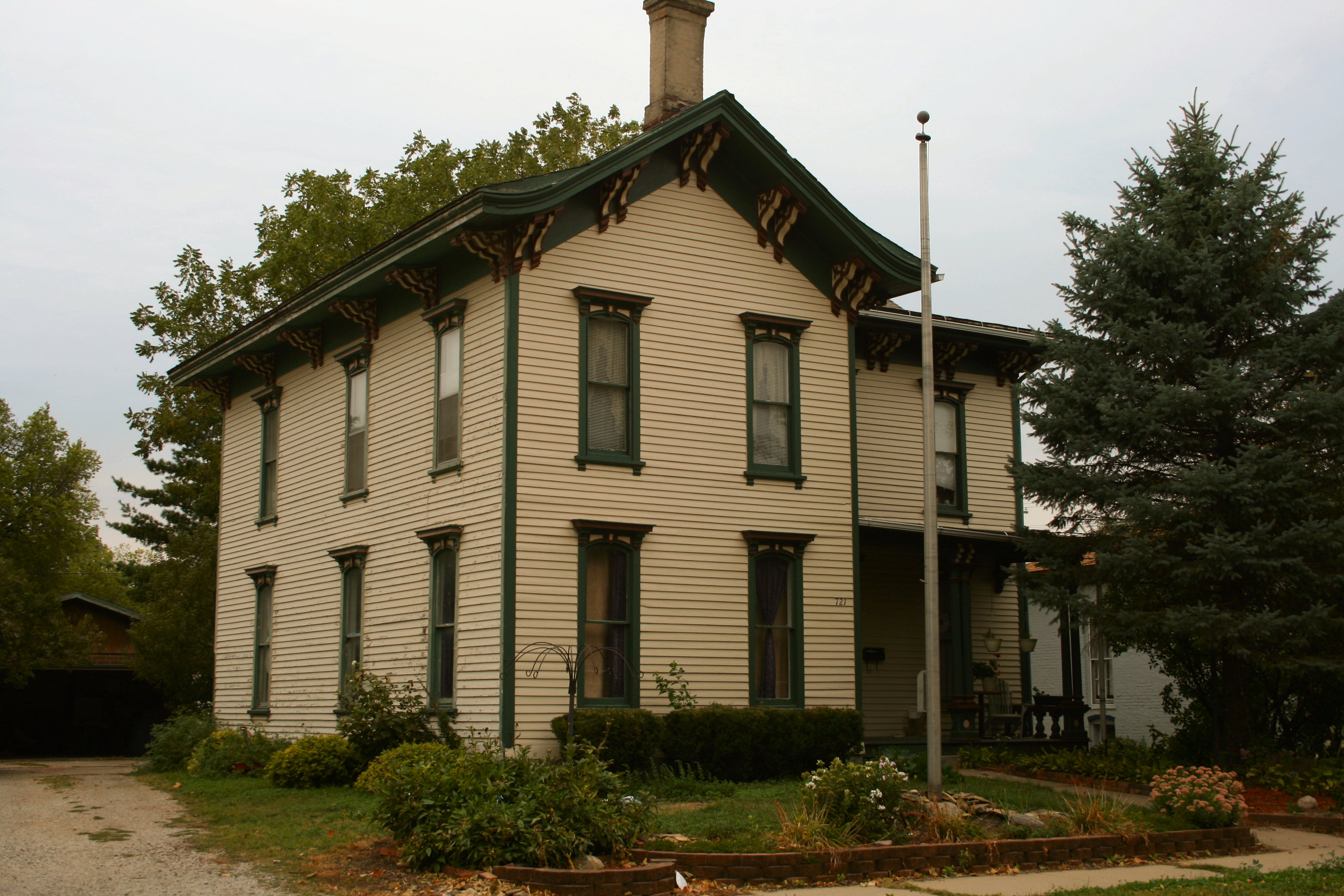

- Location within Iowa Location within the United States
- Location: 721 Carroll St. Boone, Iowa
- Coordinates: 42°03′48″N 93°53′07″W
- Area: Less than one acre
- Built: 1871
- Architectural style: Italianate
- NRHP reference No.: 94001102
- Added to NRHP: September 8, 1994

The Perrigo-Holmes House is a historic residence located in Boone, Iowa, United States. Joel C. Perrigo was a Vermont native who worked for several different railroads, including the Chicago and North Western, which probably brought him to Boone. He also had extensive land holdings in the county. Adoniram J. Holmes was a local attorney who was elected the mayor of Boone before being elected to the United States House of Representatives as a Republican. He represented Iowa's 10th congressional district before serving as the Sergeant at Arms of the United States House of Representatives. He and his wife Emma bought the house right after he was elected to congress. Perrigo had the two-story, frame high-style Italianate house built around 1871. The L-shaped structure features paired brackets under the eaves, and the front porch is located in the inside angle. A barn, believed to be a contemporary of the house, is also part of historic listing. It is one of a few town barns left in Boone. The house was listed on the National Register of Historic Places in 1994.
