= Holme, West Lindsey =

Site of a lost settlement in West Lindsey, Lincolnshire, England

Coordinates: 53.271026°N 0.439929°W

Holme
- Location within Lincolnshire
- OS grid reference: TF041760
  - London: 120 mi (190 km) S
- Shire county: Lincolnshire
- Region: East Midlands
- Country: England
- Sovereign state: United Kingdom
- Police: Lincolnshire
- Fire: Lincolnshire
- Ambulance: East Midlands

Holme is the site of a lost settlement in West Lindsey, Lincolnshire, England. It is situated approximately 4 miles (6 km) north-east from the city of Lincoln, and contained within the village of Sudbrooke, between Main Drive to the east and Holme Drive to the west.

Holme was documented as a village in 1334, but no trace remains today. Holme was in the Lawress Wapentake.
