= Mount Hayes (Antarctica) =

Mountain in Graham Land, Antarctica

Coordinates: 66°50′S 64°10′W

Highest point
- Elevation: 1,140 m (3,740 ft)

Geography
- Location: Graham Land, Antarctica

Geology
- Mountain type: Plateau-type mountain

Mount Hayes is a plateau-type mountain, 1,140 metres (3,740 ft), situated at the base of Cole Peninsula on the east coast of Graham Land, Antarctica. It was charted in 1947 by the Falkland Islands Dependencies Survey (FIDS), who named it for Rev. Gordon Hayes, Antarctic historian and author of Antarctica: A Treatise on the Southern Continent and The Conquest of the South Pole.

== See also ==
- McClary Ridge, crescent-shaped ridge 5 nautical miles (9 km) south-southeast of Mount Hayes
