= Joseph Holmes House =

Historic house in Massachusetts, United States

- U.S. National Register of Historic Places
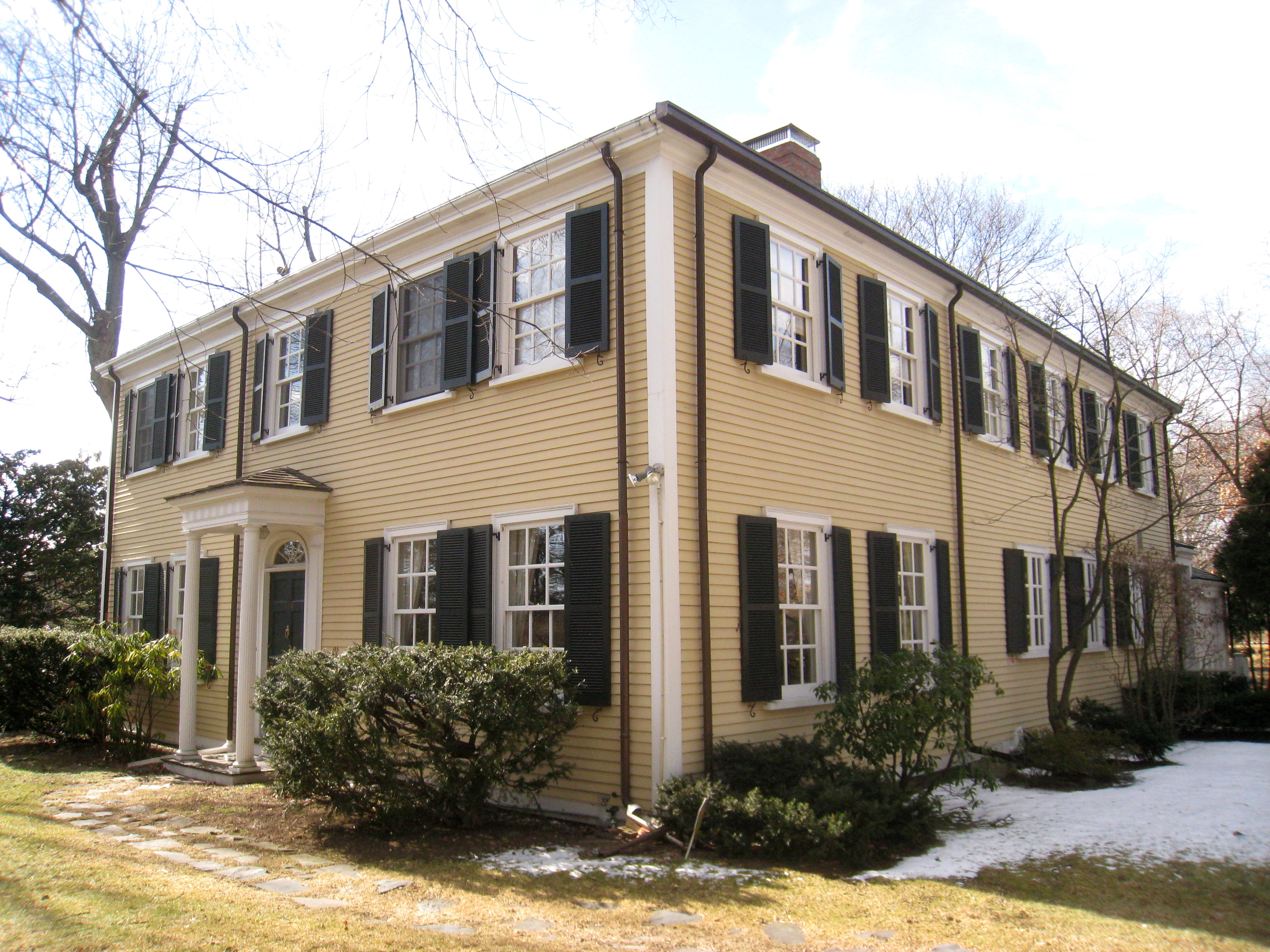

- Location within Massachusetts Location within the United States
- Location: Cambridge, Massachusetts
- Coordinates: 42°22′18″N 71°8′24″W
- Built: 1801
- Architect: Holmes, John
- Architectural style: Federal
- MPS: Cambridge MRA
- NRHP reference No.: 83000808
- Added to NRHP: June 30, 1983

The Joseph Holmes House is an historic house at 144 Coolidge Hill Street in Cambridge, Massachusetts. The 2 1/2-story wood-frame house was built in 1801 by John Holmes, father of Joseph Holmes. It was originally located on Appian Way in Harvard Square, and was moved to its present location in 1929, at which time an ell was also added. It is a well-preserved yet unpretentious Federal-style house, a rarity in "Old Cambridge", where such houses were once quite common. This house is not particularly pretentious, with a five-bay facade and center entrance, and is set sideways on its narrow lot.

The house was listed on the National Register of Historic Places in 1983.

== See also ==
- National Register of Historic Places listings in Cambridge, Massachusetts
