= Holmes Ridge =

Holmes Ridge (79°10′S 156°42′E) is a rock ridge, 2 nautical miles (4 km) long, which is the largest feature in the western part of the Finger Ridges in the Cook Mountains of Antarctica. It was named after Robert E. Holmes of the Space Science and Engineering Center, University of Wisconsin–Madison, who was involved with the siting and operation of automatic weather station units throughout Antarctica, 1991–97.
