= Kui Kinyanjui =

Kenyan journalist and media relations executive

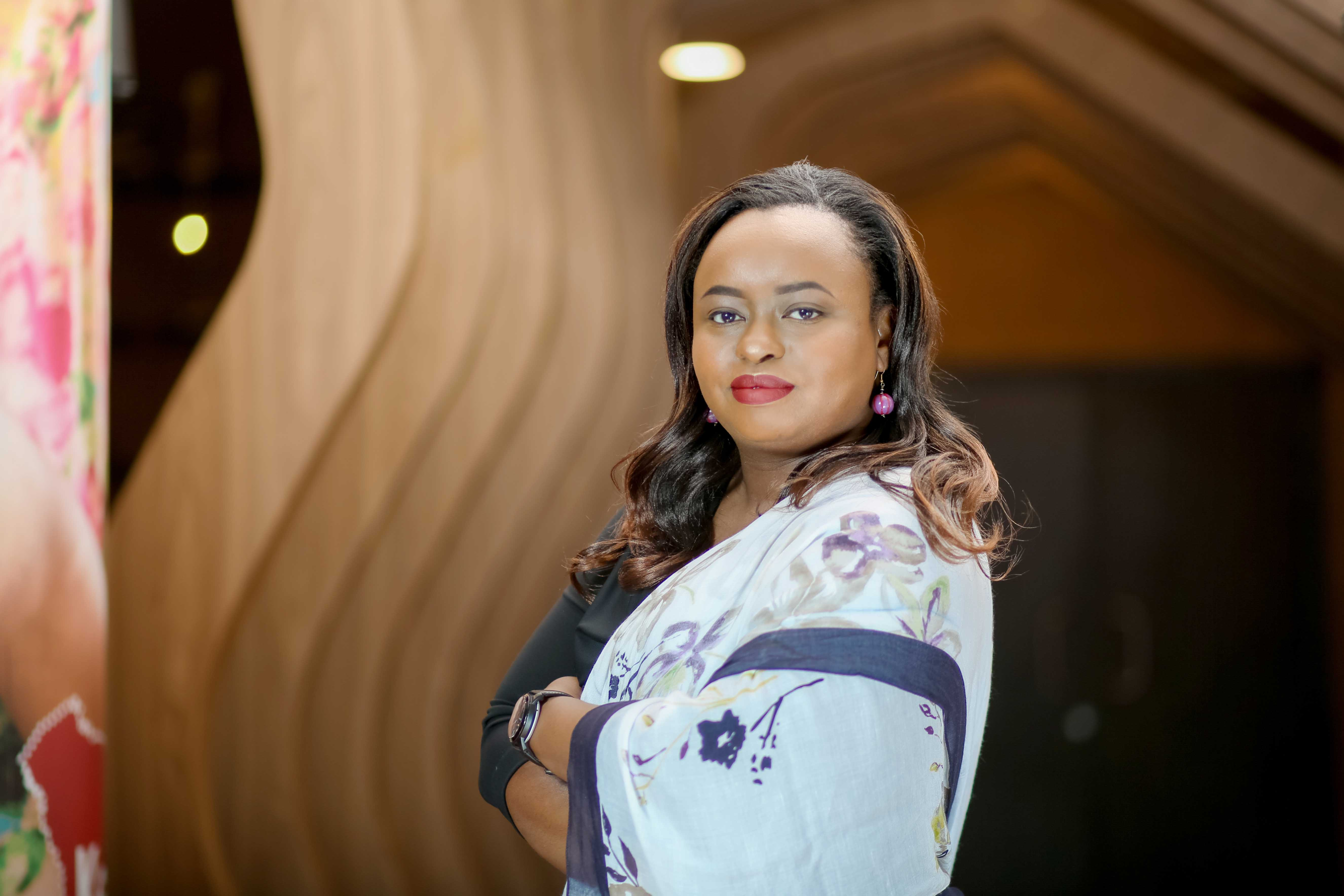
- Kinyanjui in 2017
- Born: Kenya
- Other names: Marie-Anne Kinyanjui; Marie-Anne Kui Kinyanjui
- Occupations: Journalist; Media relations
- Years active: 2000-present

Kui Kinyanjui is a former Kenyan journalist and external affairs executive. As a journalist, she most recently worked at the Kenyan newspaper Business Daily where she covers the information, communication and technology beats. She has since worked for Wikipedia, Safaricom and other companies.

== Early life and education ==
Kinyanjui was born and raised in Kenya, attending school in the country until high school, when she moved to the United States to attend the Madeira School. She then went on to study journalism at Fordham University.

== Career ==
Kinyanjui's formal career began in 2000, when she began to freelance for a selection of international titles. In 2001, she worked for Kenya's oldest business journal known as the Executive, where she rose from the position of editorial assistant to become a regular writer for the monthly publication.

Later in 2001, Kinyanjui moved to PC World East Africa, where she rose to the position of Editor, reporting on technology in the East African region. Her work there also included conducting Public Relations work for brands such as Toshiba and Gateway. Once the owners of the magazine made a decision to fold the publication, Kinyanjui embarked on forming her own start-up to continue publishing the magazine, which is the regional version of PC World, and IDG publication.

In 2005, Kinyanjui went to work for Ogilvy & Mather PR East Africa in its Nairobi office where she worked on communications with the tech and fast-moving consumer goods (FMCG) sectors.

In 2006, Kinyanjui was among the founding journalists that formed Nation Media Group's Business Daily. She wrote about the region's fast growing Information and communications technology (ICT) sector for Kenya's first daily business newspaper. Based out of Nation Media Group's Nairobi bureau, Kinyanjui edited a standalone pullout known as Digital Business in the paper, where she continued to cover the ICT sector.

In 2008, Business Daily won the Diageo Africa Business Reporting Award (DABRA) for business reporting.

From 2011 to 2014, Kinyanjui worked at IBM, where she was in charge of external relations for IBM's African hardware sector.

In 2014, Kinyanjui left IBM for the position of Senior Manager, Corporate Communications at Safaricom.

In 2015, Kinyanjui was appointed Head of Corporate Communications at Safaricom in Kenya.

In January 2018, Executive Director Katherine Maher announced that Kinyanjui would be joining the Wikimedia Foundation in March 2018 as its Vice President of Communications.

In 2019, she re-joined Safaricom as its Head of Regulatory and Public Policy.
