= Samuel Holmes House =

Historic house in Illinois, United States

- U.S. National Register of Historic Places
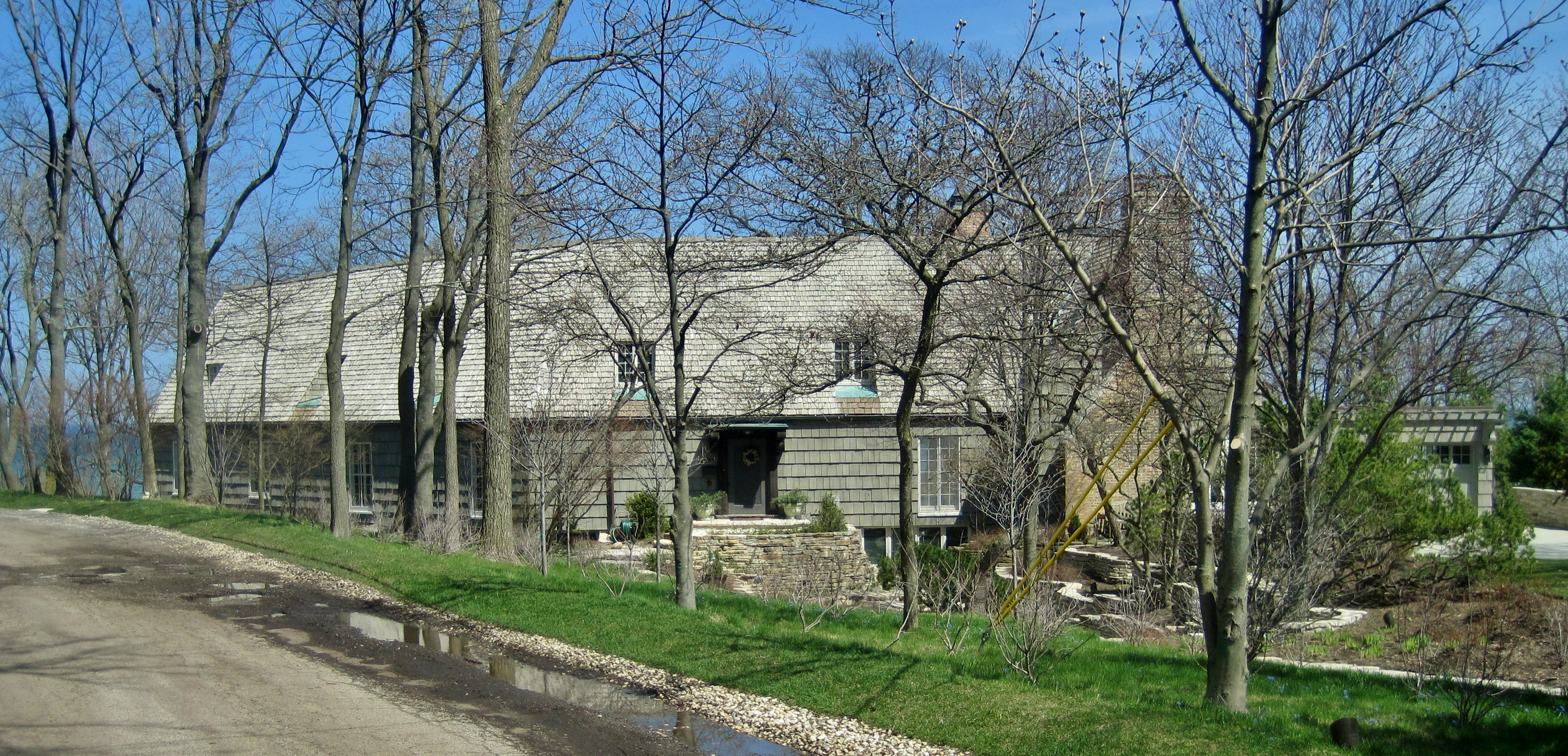

- Location within Chicago metropolitan area Location within Illinois Location within the United States
- Location: 2693 Sheridan Rd., Highland Park, Illinois
- Coordinates: 42°12′09″N 87°47′50″W
- Area: 2.5 acres (1.0 ha)
- Built: 1926
- Architect: Robert E. Seyfarth
- Architectural style: Shingle style
- MPS: Highland Park MRA
- NRHP reference No.: 82002565
- Added to NRHP: September 29, 1982

The Samuel Holmes House is a historic house at 2693 Sheridan Road in Highland Park, Illinois. Built in 1926, the Shingle style house was designed by architect Robert Seyfarth. The house is one of several Seyfarth-designed buildings in Highland Park and a rare example of the Shingle style in the city. The house's design includes an asymmetrical form, a gable roof with inset dormers, and a cedar shake sided exterior. Noted landscape architect Jens Jensen designed the house's grounds.

The house was added to the National Register of Historic Places on September 29, 1982.
