= Goodhope, West Virginia =

Unincorporated community in West Virginia, United States

Good Hope, West Virginia
- Unincorporated community
- Location within West Virginia Location within the United States
- Coordinates: 39°10′53″N 80°26′21″W
- Country: United States
- State: West Virginia
- County: Harrison
- Elevation: 1,020 ft (310 m)
- Time zone: UTC-5 (Eastern (EST))
  - Summer (DST): UTC-4 (EDT)
- Area codes: 304 & 681
- GNIS feature ID: 1554579

Goodhope is an unincorporated community in Harrison County, West Virginia, United States. Goodhope is located along U.S. Route 19 and the West Fork River, 2.3 miles (3.7 km) southwest of West Milford.
