= Holmes (given name) =

Holmes is the given name of:

- Holmes Alexander (1906–1985), American historian, journalist, syndicated columnist and politician
- Holmes Beckwith (1884–1921), American political scientist and professor who killed his dean and then himself
- Holmes Braddock (1925–2025), American politician
- Holmes Colbert, Native American leader of the Chickasaw Nation and writer of the Chickasaw Nation's constitution in the 1850s
- Holmes Conrad (1840–1915), American politician, lawyer and military officer
- Holmes Herbert (1882–1956), English character actor
- Holmes Rolston III (born 1932), philosopher, author and professor
- Holmes Tuttle (1905–1989), American businessman and political adviser to Ronald Reagan

== See also ==
- Holmes (surname)
