= William L. Holmes House =

- U.S. National Register of Historic Places
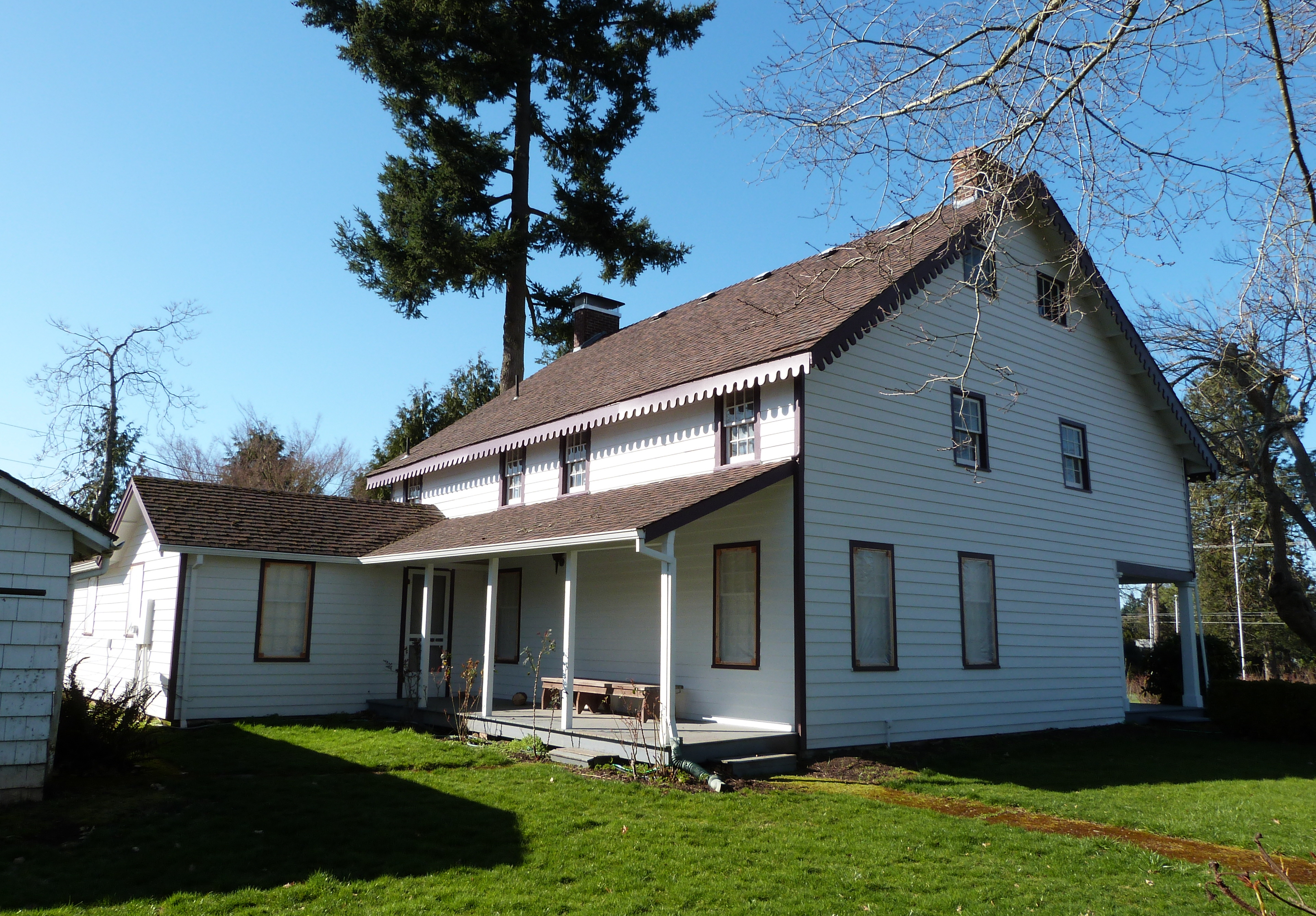

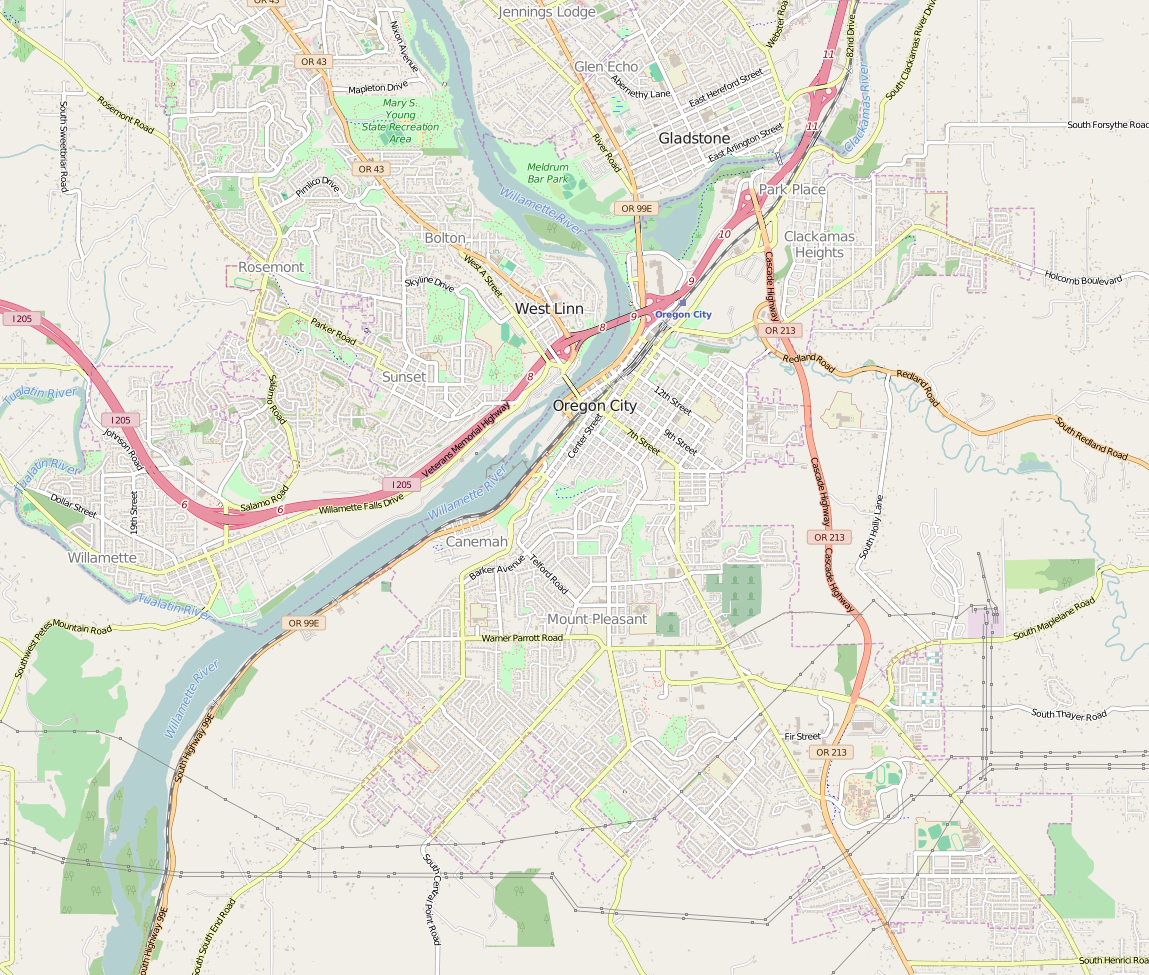
- Location within Oregon City OR Location within Oregon Location within the United States
- Location: 534 Holmes Lane, Oregon City, Oregon
- Coordinates: 45°20′29.75″N 122°36′3.77″W
- Area: 1.9 acres (0.77 ha)
- Built: 1848
- NRHP reference No.: 74001678
- Added to NRHP: December 2, 1974

The William L. Holmes House, also known as Rose Farm, was built in 1848 by William L. Holmes in Oregon City, Oregon. One of the oldest structures in Oregon, it was the site of the inauguration of the first Territorial Governor of Oregon, Joseph Lane in 1849. The house replaced an 1844 log cabin built by Holmes, a South Carolina native who moved with his family to Oregon in 1843.

The house is a 2 1/2-story frame structure. It has been extensively altered, with the removal of a rear ell. The changes have not been well documented, and the National Register of Historic Places nomination notes that information about the house, including its Historic American Buildings Survey data, includes "romanticized misinformation."

The Holmes house was placed on the National Register of Historic Places on December 2, 1974. It has been preserved and may be visited.
