= Pâncești, Neamț =

Pâncești
- Commune
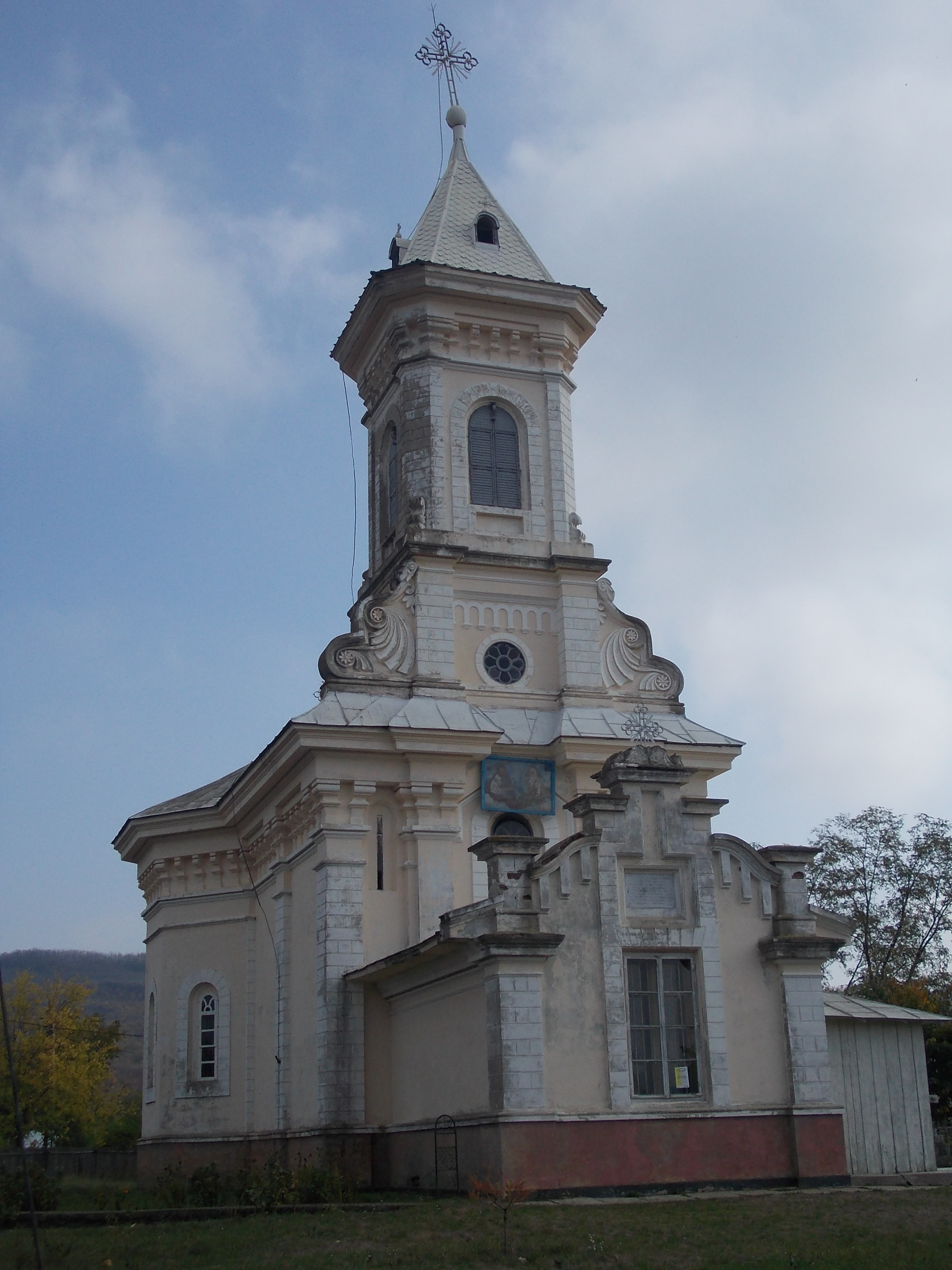
- Church in Pânceşti

- Location in Neamț County

- Location in Romania
- Coordinates: 46.905°N 27.154°E
- Country: Romania
- County: Neamț

Government
  - Mayor (2024–2028): Constantin-Augustin Holmanu (PSD)
- Area: 40.18 km^{2} (15.51 sq mi)
- Elevation: 226 m (741 ft)
- Population (2021-12-01): 1,212
  - Density: 30.16/km^{2} (78.13/sq mi)
- Time zone: UTC+02:00 (EET)
  - Summer (DST): UTC+03:00 (EEST)
- Postal code: 617366
- Area code: +(40) 233
- Vehicle reg.: NT
- Website: www.primariapancesti.ro

Pâncești is a commune in Neamț County, Western Moldavia, Romania. It is composed of five villages: Ciurea, Holm, Pâncești, Tălpălăi, and Patricheni. These were part of Poienari Commune until 2004, when they were split off.

Historical population
Year	Pop.	±%
2002	1,584	—
2011	1,350	−14.8%
2021	1,212	−10.2%
Source: Census data
