= Holmes Island (Washington) =

Island in Puget Sound, Washington state

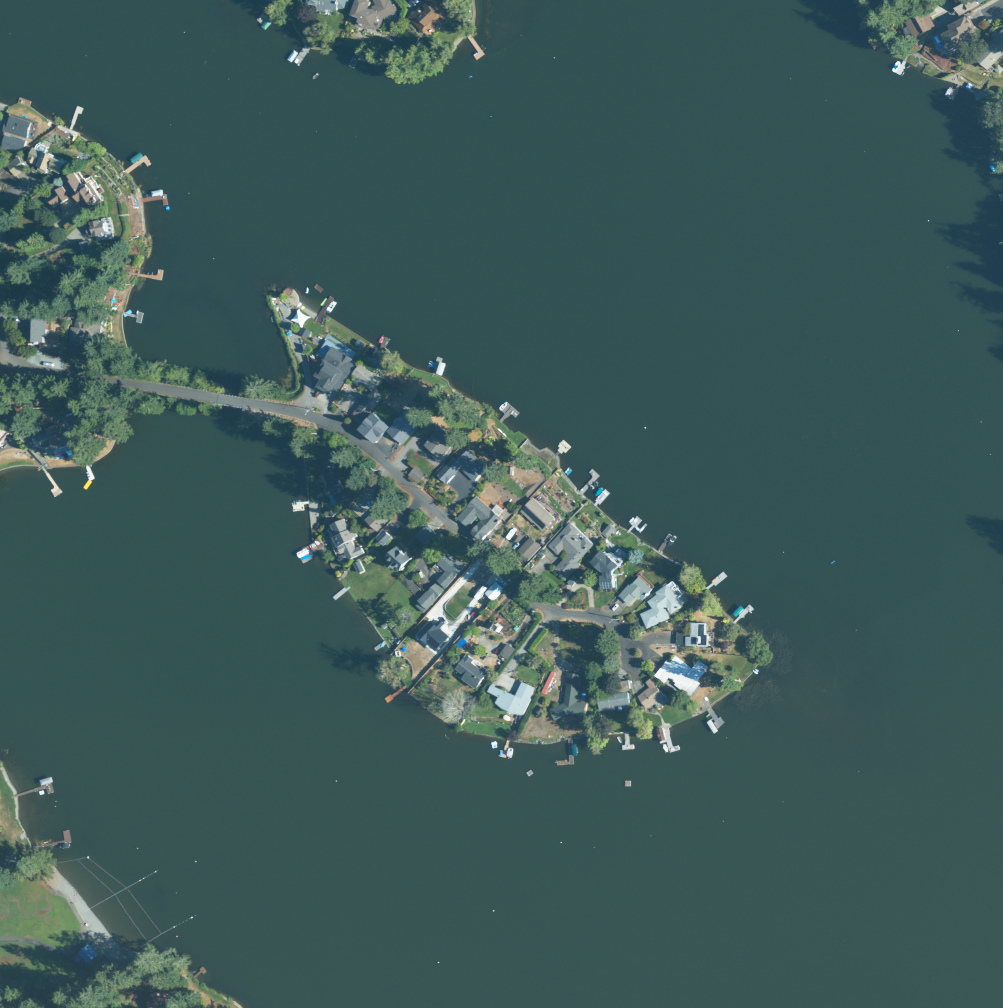
- Holmes Island in August 2023

Geography
- Location: Long Lake
- Coordinates: 47°01′27″N 122°46′50″W

Administration
- United States
- State: Washington
- County: Thurston County

Additional information
- Time zone: PST (UTC-8)
  - Summer (DST): PDT (UTC-7)

Holmes Island is an island in the U.S. state of Washington.

Holmes Island was named after Albin Holmes, a railroad man who settled there.

== See also ==
- List of geographic features in Thurston County, Washington
