= Holmes Island (Antarctica) =

One of the Biscoe Islands of Antarctica

Holmes Island (65°41′S 65°15′W) is an island 1.5 nautical miles (3 km) long, lying south of Vieugue Island in the Biscoe Islands of Antarctica. It was charted by the British Graham Land Expedition under John Rymill, 1934–37, and was named by the UK Antarctic Place-Names Committee for Bryan Holmes, a Falkland Islands Dependencies Survey surveyor at Prospect Point in 1957, who was attached to the British Naval Hydrographic Survey Unit in this area, 1957–58.

== See also ==
- List of Antarctic and sub-Antarctic islands
