= William Frederick Holmes House =

Historic house in Mississippi, United States

- U.S. National Register of Historic Places
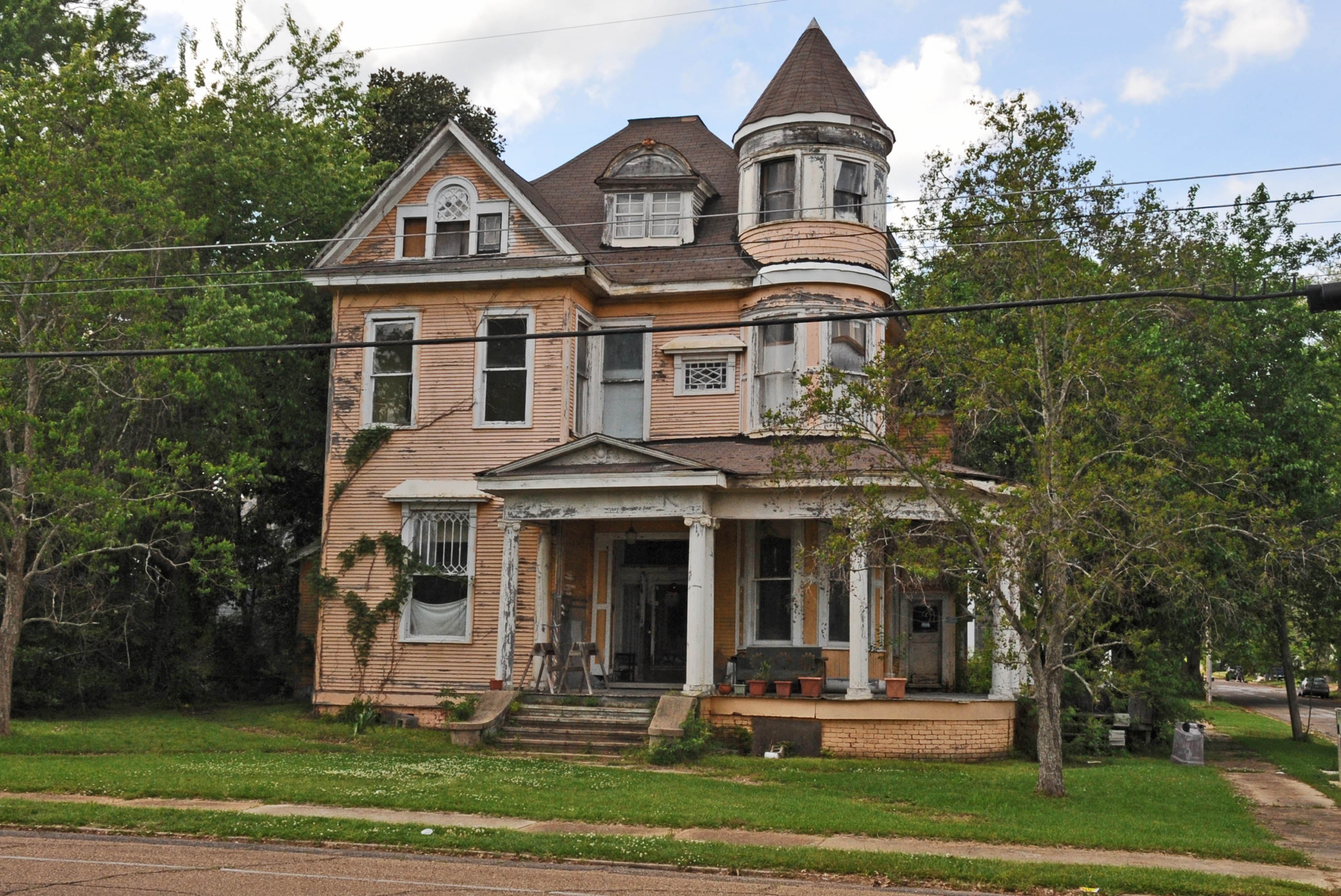
- 2008 photo of the house

- Location within Mississippi
- Location: 302 Third St., McComb, Mississippi
- Coordinates: 31°14′30″N 90°27′18″W
- Area: less than one acre
- Built: 1894
- Architectural style: Queen Anne
- NRHP reference No.: 04000216
- Added to NRHP: March 22, 2004

The William Frederick Holmes House, also known as Theosa, is a Queen Anne-style house in McComb, Mississippi, listed on the U.S. National Register of Historic Places in 2004. It was called "one of the largest and most prominent examples of Victorian Queen Anne residential architecture in McComb" and "one of several noteworthy examples in Pike County".
