= Mount Holmes (Wyoming) =

Mountain in Wyoming, United States

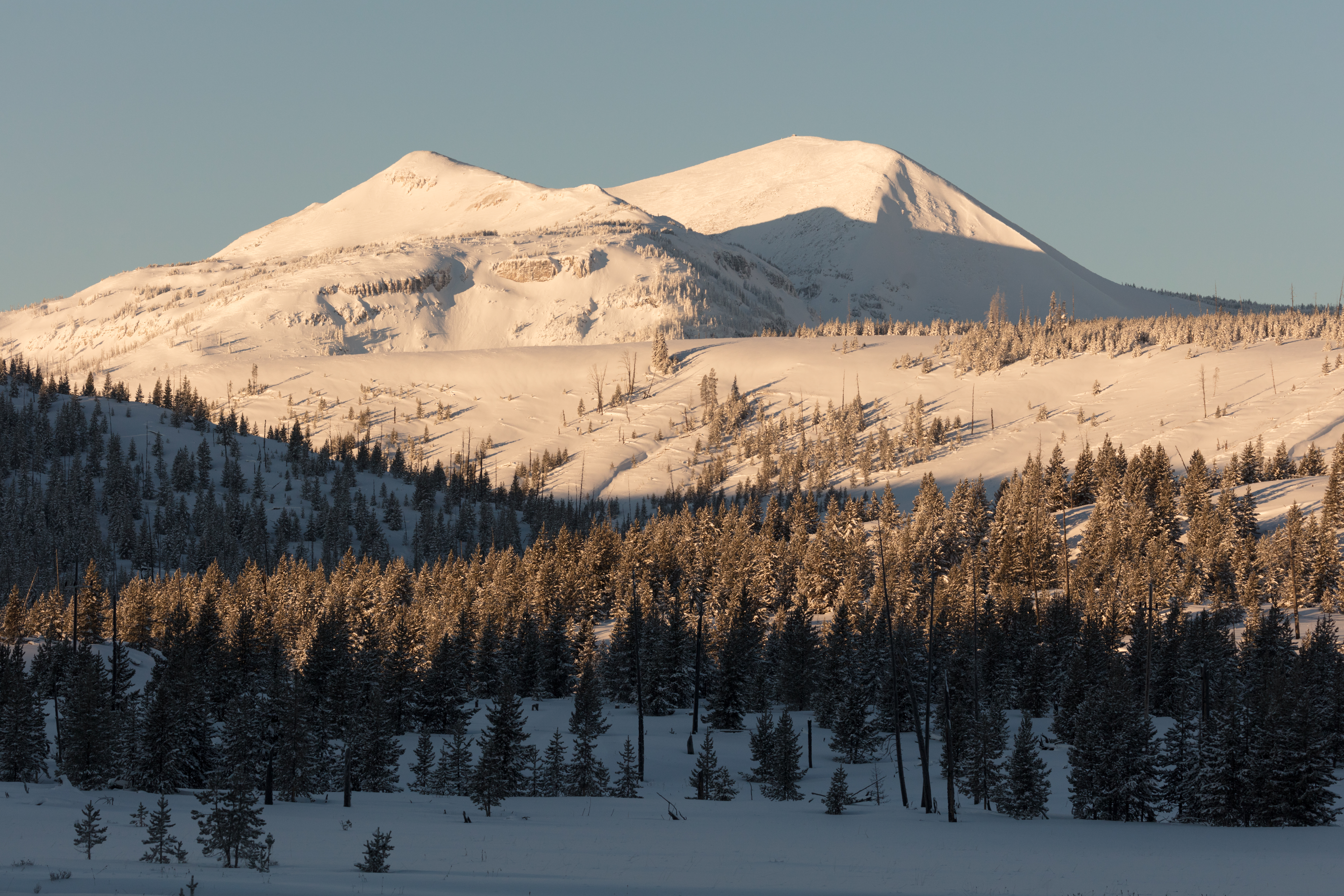
- Morning light on Trilobite Point and Mt. Holmes

Highest point
- Elevation: 10,336 ft (3,150 m) NAVD 88
- Coordinates: 44°49′08″N 110°51′21″W

Geography
- Location: Yellowstone National Park, Park County, Wyoming, U.S.
- Parent range: Gallatin Range
- Topo map: Mount Holmes

Climbing
- Easiest route: Hike

Mount Holmes is a prominent mountain peak in Yellowstone National Park. It is the tallest mountain in the Wyoming portion of the Gallatin Range. Mount Holmes is located in the northwestern part of the park and marks the southern terminus of the Gallatin Range. It is the source of Indian Creek, a tributary of the Gardner River.

There was a historic fire watch tower near the top of Mount Holmes, before it was burned due to a lightning strike. The Bannock Trail crosses the mountains close to Mount Holmes.

== History ==
Location among the southern Gallatin Range of Wyoming

An 1860 map by Captain William F. Raynolds showed this peak as Mount Gallatin. Prior to 1878, the peak was routinely referred to as Mount Madison because of its proximity to the Madison River. In 1878 Henry Gannett and geologist William H. Holmes, members of the third Hayden Geologic Survey, ascended the peak. Gannett named the peak Mount Holmes.

The summit of Mount Holmes can be reached via the 10.8 miles (17.4 km) Mount Holmes-Winter Creek trail. The trailhead is located near Apollonaris Spring on the Mammoth-Norris section of the Grand Loop Road.

Images of Mount Holmes
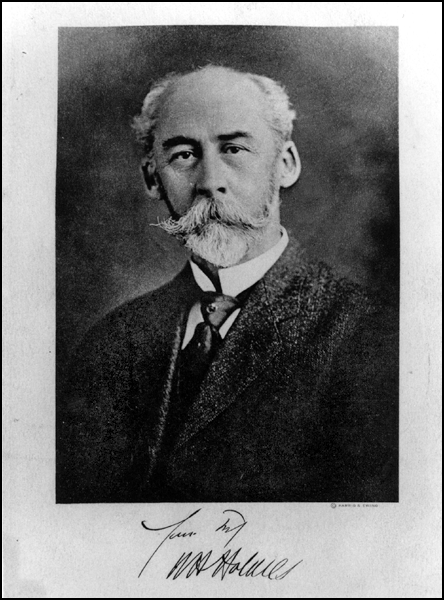
Mount Holmes' namesake, William H. Holmes

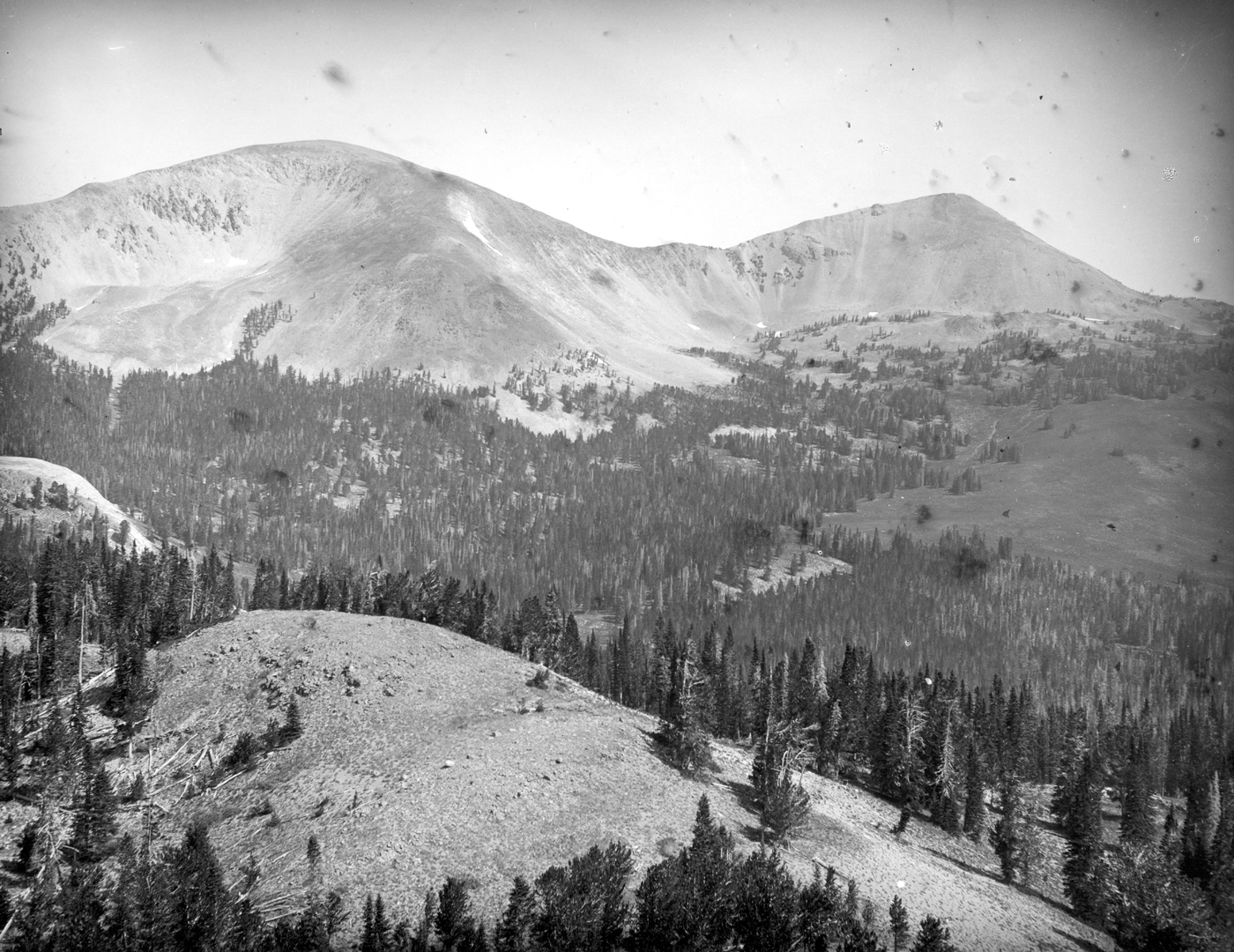
Mount Holmes as seen from Winter Creek, 1890

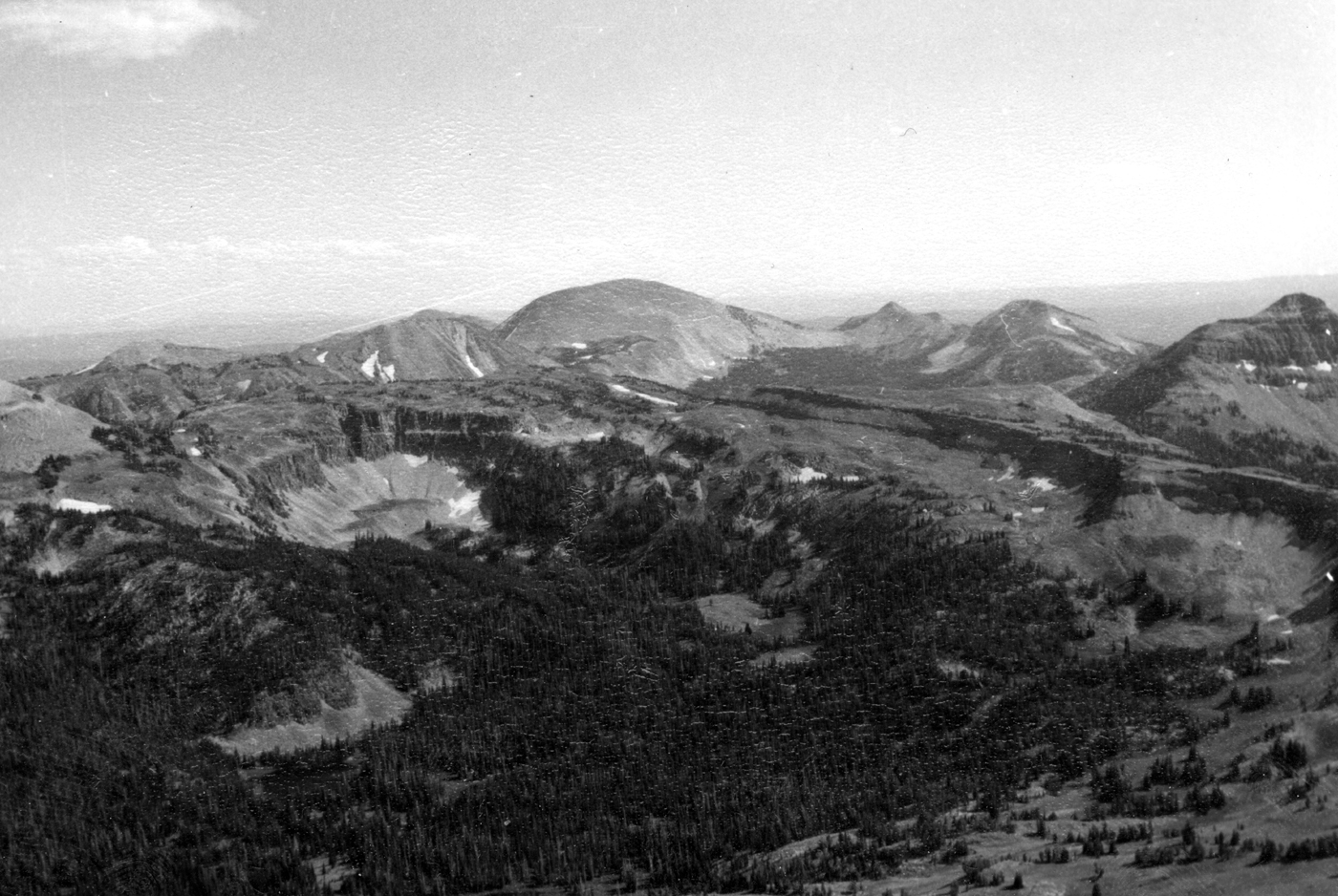
Mount Holmes and other peaks, 1963

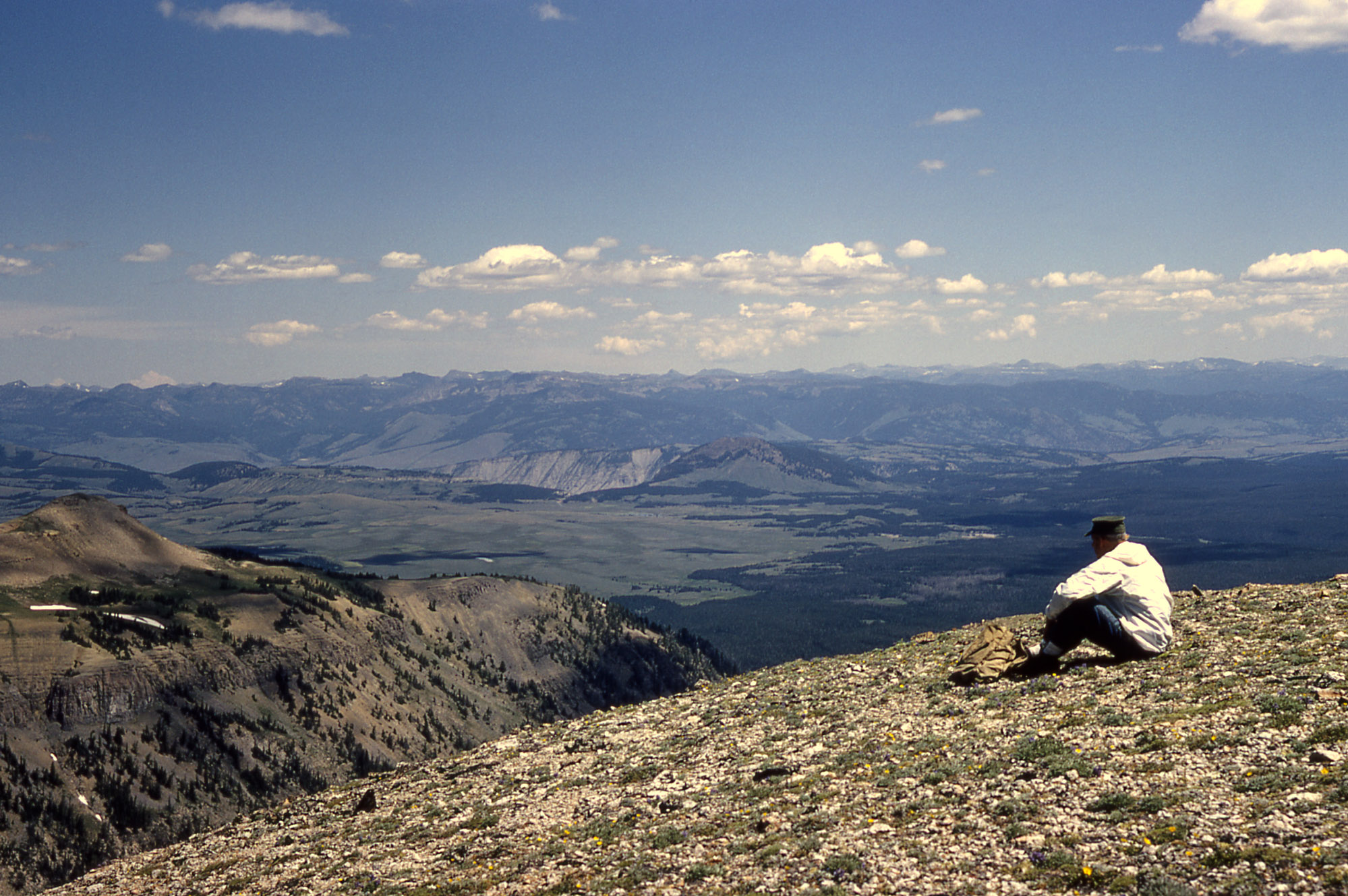
Looking east from summit of Mount Holmes, 1965

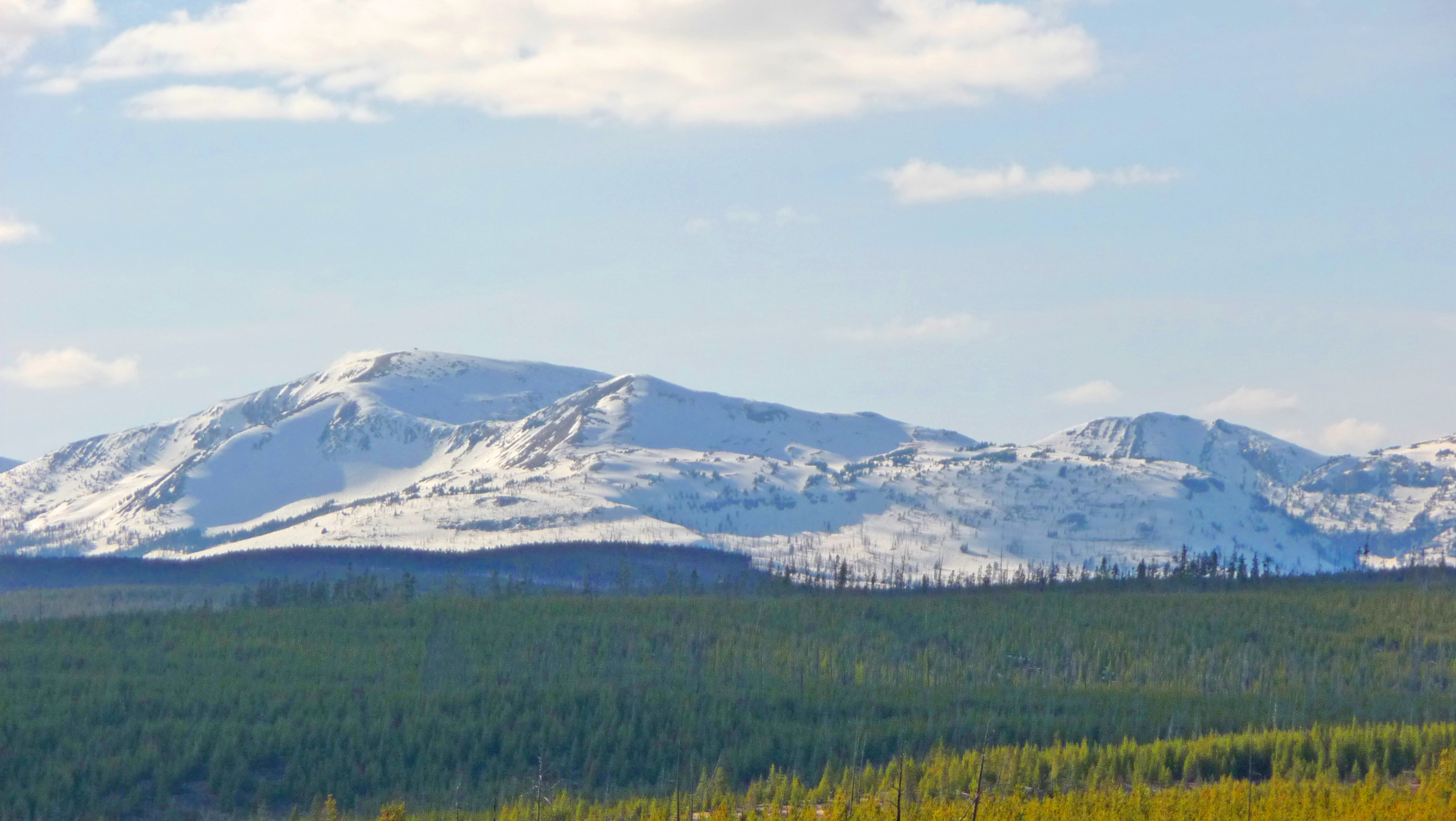
2009

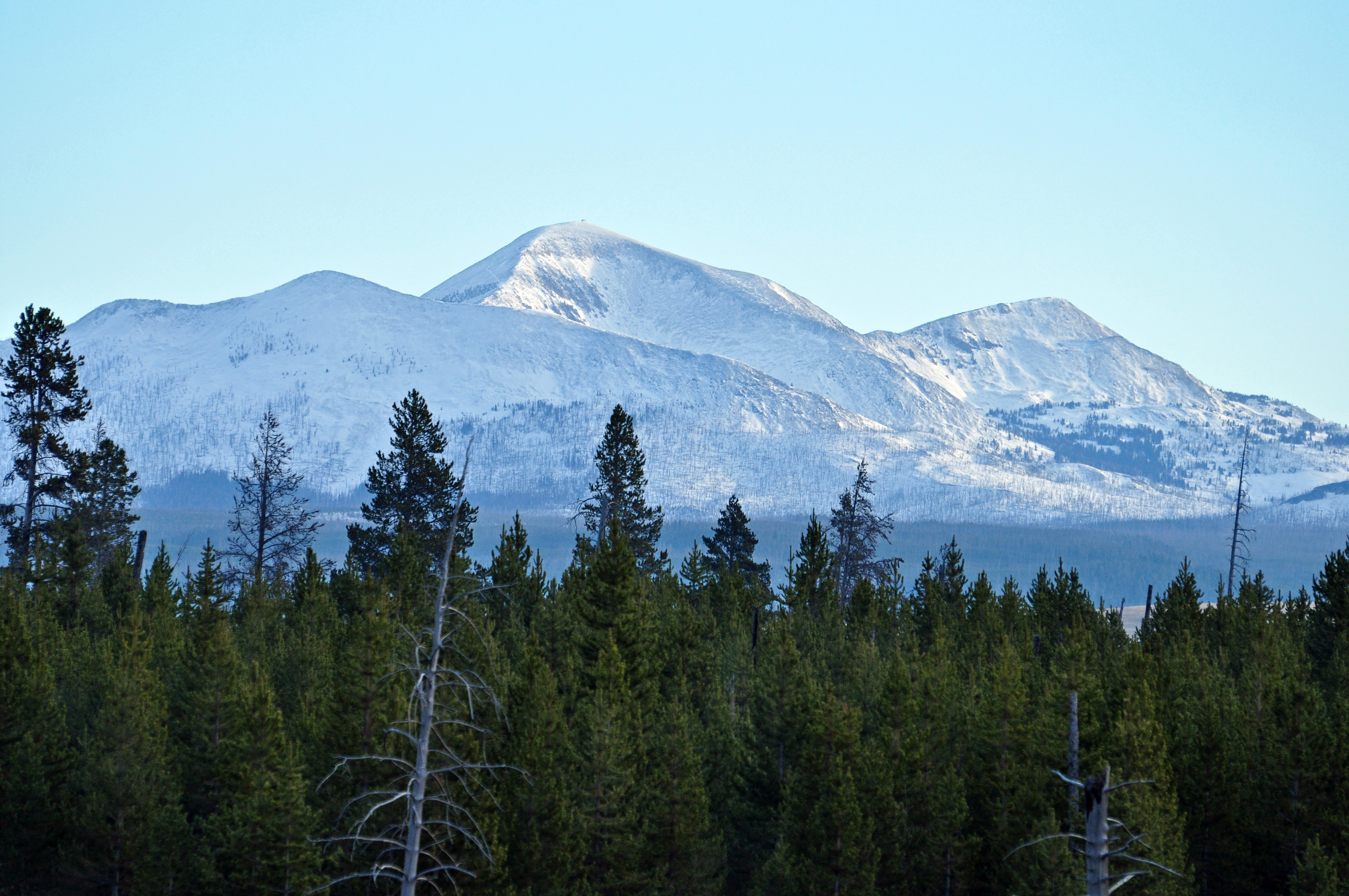
Mount Holmes (center) from Madison River, October 2010

== See also ==
- Mountains and mountain ranges of Yellowstone National Park
