= Emma Dean =

Emma Dean may refer to:

- Emma Dean Powell (1835–1924), American botanist and ornithologist
- Emma Dean (chef) (born 1977), Australian cook and television presenter
- Emma Dean (crater), a small impact crater on Mars
- Emma Dean (musician) (active since 1998), Australian singer-songwriter and multi-instrumentalist
