= The Exploration of the Colorado River and Its Canyons =

1875 book by John Wesley Powell

The Exploration of the Colorado River and Its Canyons (1875) by John Wesley Powell is a classic of American exploration literature. It is about the Powell Geographic Expedition of 1869 which was the first trip down the Colorado River by boat, including the first trip through the Grand Canyon.

Powell's first written accounts of his exploration appeared in the January, February and March 1875 editions of Scribner’s Monthly as "The Cañons of the Colorado". Powell published a longer book in 1875 under the title The Exploration of the Colorado River of the West and Its Tributaries. Explored in 1869, 1870, 1871, and 1872, under the direction of the Secretary of the Smithsonian Institution. It was revised and published by Flood & Vincent in 1895 as Canyons of the Colorado. A modern Penguin edition with an introduction by Wallace Stegner was published in 1987 under the title The Exploration of the Colorado River and Its Canyons.

The book includes hundreds of wood engravings based on photographs by E.O. Beaman, James Fennemore and John Karl Hillers, and drawings by Thomas Moran.
