= Dellenbaugh Butte =

Mountain in Utah, United States

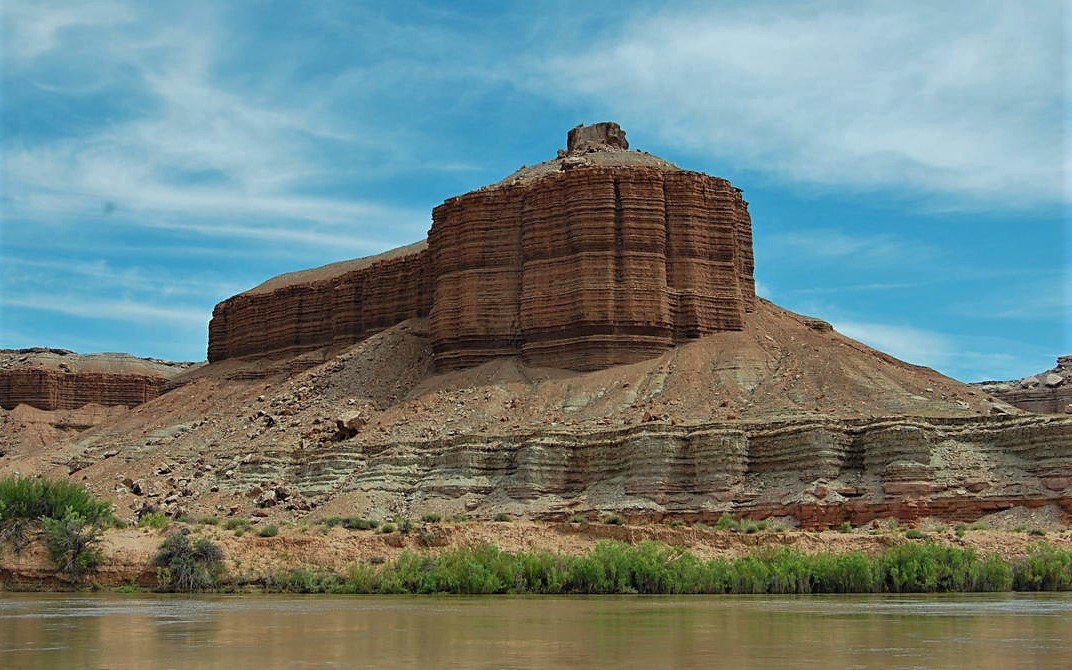
- Dellenbaugh Butte, from Green River, June 2019

Highest point
- Elevation: 4,395 ft (1,340 m)
- Prominence: 55 ft (17 m)
- Isolation: 2.23 mi (3.59 km)
- Coordinates: 38°49′30″N 110°06′42″W

Geography
- Location within Utah Location within the United States
- Location: Grand County, Utah, US
- Parent range: Colorado Plateau
- Topo map: USGS Green River SE

Geology
- Rock age: Late Jurassic
- Rock type: Summerville Formation

Dellenbaugh Butte is a summit in Grand County of the U.S. state of Utah. Dellenbaugh Butte is the 2348th highest summit in the state of Utah.

== Description ==
Dellenbaugh Butte has the name of Frederick Samuel Dellenbaugh (1853–1935), an explorer. Dellenbaugh was an artist and assistant topographer with Major John Wesley Powell's expedition when Powell camped at this location along the Green River. The butte is primarily composed of the Summerville Formation, which consists of distinctive, thin beds of shale, siltstone, and sandstone.

== Climate ==
According to the Köppen climate classification system, it is located in a Cold semi-arid climate zone, which is defined by the coldest month having an average mean temperature below −0 °C (32 °F) and at least 50% of the total annual precipitation being received during the spring and summer. This desert climate receives less than 10 inches (250 millimetres) of annual rainfall, and snowfall is generally light during the winter. Spring and fall are the most favorable seasons to visit.

== See also ==
- Colorado Plateau
