= Powell Geographic Expedition of 1869 =

1869 cartographic survey and exploration of the Grand Canyon

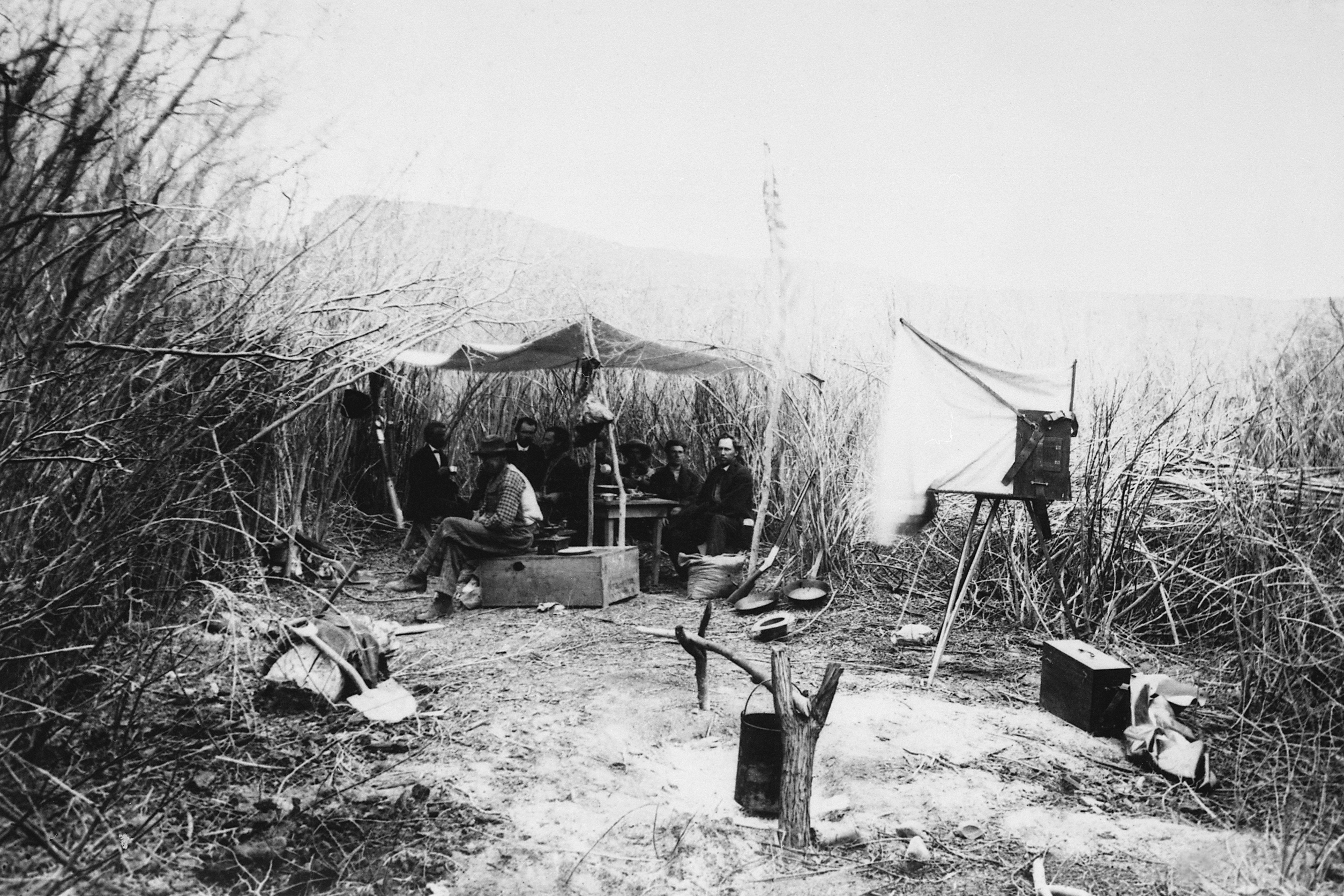
First camp of the second John Wesley Powell expedition, in the willows, Green River, Wyoming, 1871. Depicted left to right are Professor Almon Harris Thompson, Andrew Hattan, S.V. Jones, John F. Steward, W.C. Powell, Frank C.A. Richardson, Frederick Dellenbaugh, and F.M. Bishop. There were no photographs taken on the 1869 expedition.

The Powell Geographic Expedition of 1869, led by American naturalist John Wesley Powell, was the first thorough cartographic and scientific investigation of long segments of the Green and Colorado rivers in the southwestern United States, including the first recorded passage of white men through the entirety of the Grand Canyon. The expedition, which lasted approximately three months during the summer of 1869, embarked from Green River Station, Wyoming Territory and traveled downstream through parts of the present-day states of Colorado and Utah before reaching the confluence of the Colorado and Virgin rivers in present-day Arizona and Nevada. Despite a series of hardships, including losses of boats and supplies, near-drownings, and the eventual departures of several crew members, the voyage produced the first detailed descriptions of much of the previously unexplored canyon country of the Colorado Plateau.

Powell retraced part of the 1869 route on a second expedition in the winter of 1871–1872. In 1875, he published a written account of the first expedition (interspersed with elements from the second) called Report on the Exploration of the Colorado River of the West and Its Tributaries, which was revised and reissued in 1895 as The Exploration of the Colorado River and Its Canyons and has since been hailed as a classic of American exploration literature.

== Expedition members ==
Members of the Powell Geographic Expedition of 1869
Boat	Crew	Powell's Notes
Emma Dean	John Wesley Powell	[Expedition leader, geologist, U.S. Army Major & brevet lieutenant colonel; lost most of his right arm at the Battle of Shiloh.]
Emma Dean	John Colton "Jack" Sumner	Powell described Sumner as "a soldier during the late [American Civil] war, and before and since that time has been a great traveler in the wilds of the Mississippi Valley and the Rocky Mountains as an amateur hunter. He is a fair-haired, delicate-looking man, but a veteran in experience, and has performed the feat of crossing the Rocky Mountains in midwinter on snowshoes. He spent the winter of 1886-87 in Middle Park, Colorado, for the purpose of making some natural history collections, and succeeded in killing three grizzlies, two mountain lions, and a large number of elk, deer, sheep, wolves, beavers, and many other animals. When Bayard Taylor traveled through the parks of Colorado, Sumner was his guide, and he speaks in glowing terms of Mr. Taylor's genial qualities in camp, but he was mortally offended when the great traveler requested him to act as doorkeeper at Breckenridge to receive the admission fee from those who attended his lectures."
Emma Dean	William H. Dunn	"Dunn was a hunter, trapper, and mule-packer in Colorado for many years. He dresses in buckskin with a dark oleaginous luster, doubtless due to the fact that he has lived on fat venison and killed many beavers since he first donned his uniform years ago. His raven hair falls down to his back, for he has a sublime contempt of shears and razors."
Kitty Clyde's Sister	Walter H. Powell	"Captain Powell was an officer of artillery during the late [American Civil] war and was captured on the 22d day of July, 1864, at Atlanta and served a ten months' term in prison at Charleston, where he was placed with other officers under fire. He is silent, moody, and sarcastic, though sometimes he enlivens the camp at night with a song. He is never surprised at anything, his coolness never deserts him, and he would choke the belching throat of a volcano if he thought the spitfire meant anything but fun. We call him "Old Shady.""
Kitty Clyde's Sister	George Y. Bradley	"a lieutenant during the late [American Civil] war, and since orderly sergeant in the regular army, was, a few weeks previous to our start, discharged, by order of the Secretary of War, that he might go on this trip. He is scrupulously careful, and a little mishap works him into a passion, but when labor is needed he has a ready hand and powerful arm, and in danger, rapid judgment and unerring skill. A great difficulty or peril changes the petulant spirit into a brave, generous soul."
No Name	Oramel G. Howland	"O. G. Howland is a printer by trade, an editor by profession, and a hunter by choice. When busily employed he usually puts his hat in his pocket, and his thin hair and long beard stream in the wind, giving him a wild look, much like that of King Lear in an illustrated copy of Shakespeare which tumbles around the camp."
No Name	Seneca Howland	"Seneca Howland is a quiet, pensive young man, and a great favorite with all."
No Name	Frank Goodman	"Goodman is a stranger to us--a stout, willing Englishman, with florid face and more florid anticipations of a glorious trip."
Maid of the Canyon	W.R. Hawkins	"Billy Hawkins, the cook, was a soldier in the Union Army during the war, and when discharged at its close went West, and since then has been engaged as teamster on the plains or hunter in the mountains. He is an athlete and a jovial good fellow, who hardly seems to know his own strength."
Maid of the Canyon	Andrew Hall	"Hall is a Scotch boy, nineteen years old, with what seems to us a "secondhand head," which doubtless came down to him from some knight who wore it during the Border Wars. It looks a very old head indeed, with deep-set blue eyes and beaked nose. Young as he is, Hall has had experience in hunting, trapping, and fighting Indians, and he makes the most of it, for he can tell a good story, and is never encumbered by unnecessary scruples in giving to his narratives those embellishments which help to make a story complete. He is always ready for work or play and is a good hand at either."

== Journey ==
Four wooden dories were specially constructed in Chicago by boatbuilder Thomas Bagley: the pilot boat, Emma Dean (named for Powell's wife, Emma Dean Powell), was 16 feet in length, built from pine, and steered with a custom-built tiller, while the other three boats (Maid of the Canyon, Kitty Clyde's Sister, and No Name) were each 21 feet long and built from oak. The boats, scientific instruments, and ten months of rations were transported to Green River Station in the Wyoming Territory by the Union Pacific Railroad, along the route of the first transcontinental railroad, which had been completed with the placement of the golden spike at Promontory Summit in nearby Utah Territory just two weeks prior to the launch of the expedition on May 24, 1869.

Early on the Green River, the expedition lost one of their large freight boats, the No Name, at a rapids they named Disaster Falls, washing up on Disaster Island. No one was killed, but many crucial supplies were lost, including all of the expedition's barometers. Powell and his men managed to recover some of the barometers – they were critical instruments, as they were the only means Powell had at his disposal to determine altitude. Knowing the altitude was essential for producing good maps, and it allowed Powell to estimate how much vertical drop remained before the journey's endpoint, which had a known elevation. The Powell Expedition named many of the landmarks and geological features along the Green and Colorado rivers, including the Flaming Gorge, the Gates of Lodore (in what is now Dinosaur National Monument), and Glen Canyon.

Of the ten men that started out from Green River Station, only six completed the entire journey. Frank Goodman left the expedition on July 6 during the resupply at the Uinta River Indian Agency, claiming he'd had more than enough adventure. He walked away and lived for some years with the Paiutes of eastern Utah. Eventually, he settled in Vernal, Utah, where he married and raised a family. The other three adventurers to leave the expedition fared worse. On August 28, just two days from the expedition's intended destination at the mouth of the Virgin River, Oramel Howland, his brother Seneca, and Bill Dunn left the company, fearing they could not survive the dangers of the river much longer. Seneca had become a favorite of the group for his soft-spoken and good-natured personality, and he wanted to stay. In the end he remained loyal to his brother. The three men hiked out of the canyon and were never seen again. Historians still dispute their fate, but it has often been speculated that they were killed by local Shivwits Indians in a case of mistaken identity. Another story suggests that they were executed by Mormons who mistook them for U.S. government "spies" investigating the Mountain Meadows Massacre. Powell later attempted to find the truth by interviewing Shivwits leaders. Powell's Mormon interpreter told him that they killed the men after mistaking them for prospectors who had raped and killed a Shivwits woman. On August 30, 1869, ninety-eight days after launching at Green River Station, Powell and the five other remaining expedition members reached safety at the Mormon settlement of St. Thomas near the confluence of the Virgin River and the Colorado River in present-day Nevada.

== Dramatization ==
The expedition was dramatized in the 1960 Disney film Ten Who Dared and the 2015 play Men on Boats by Jaclyn Backhaus. The graphic novel Major Impossible by author Nathan Hale also dramatizes the expedition.

== See also ==
- Sam Adams (explorer)
