= Handbook on Drug and Alcohol Abuse =

A Handbook on Drug and Alcohol Abuse: The Biomedical Aspects
- Handbook on Drug and Alcohol Abuse (1975 earliest edition)
- Author: Gail Winger; Frederick G. Hofmann; James H. Woods
- Publisher: Oxford University Press
- Publication date: 1992
- Pages: 208
- ISBN: 9780199727407

A Handbook on Drug and Alcohol Abuse: The Biomedical Aspects by Gail Winger, Frederick G. Hofmann, and James H. Woods was published in New York by Oxford University Press in 1992. A 4th edition, updated with a chapter on "Club Drugs", was published in 2004.

== Reception ==
The book received a mixed reception from medical journals.

An earlier version was published in 1975 by Frederick Hofmann and Adele Hofmann as Handbook on Drug and Alcohol Abuse.
