= John F. Ross =

John F. Ross may refer to:

- John F. Ross Collegiate Vocational Institute, a public secondary school in Guelph, Ontario, Canada
- John F. Ross (author), American historian and author
