= Emma Dean (crater) =

Crater on Mars

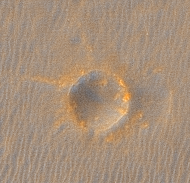
- Emma Dean, as seen by HiRISE.
- Planet: Mars
- Coordinates: 2.0°S 5.5°W
- Quadrangle: Margaritifer Sinus
- Eponym: Emma Dean

Emma Dean is a small impact crater in the Meridiani Planum extraterrestrial plain situated within the Margaritifer Sinus quadrangle (MC-19) region of the planet Mars. This geological feature was visited by the Opportunity rover from sols 929 to 943. The much larger crater Victoria lies about 100m to the east. Emma Dean lies directly on top of the ejecta blanket from Victoria and could therefore expose material originating from deep inside Victoria. The crater is named after Emma Dean, John Wesley Powell's wife and one of the boats in Grand Canyon Powell expedition.

== See also ==
- Geography of Mars
- List of craters on Mars
