= Jack Sumner =

American explorer (1840–1907)

Sumner c. 1860, shortly before enlisting in the Union Army

John Colton Sumner (1840–1907) was an American explorer who took part in the Powell Geographic Expedition of 1869. An experienced marksman and boatman, he was chosen by John Wesley Powell to lead the first boat of the expedition. He eventually had a falling out with Powell over differences in personality, and was troubled through the rest of his life over the disappearance and deaths of three other men in the expedition. His remorse and resentment became so great that, in 1902, he castrated himself.

== Early life ==
Born May 16, 1840, Sumner was one of eight siblings who grew up on a farm in Muscatine, Iowa. He became an enthusiastic reader but was not interested in farming. During the American Civil War, he became a corporal and sharpshooter in the 32nd Iowa Volunteer Infantry, fighting for the Union at Vicksburg and Nashville. When fighting in the Battle of Pleasant Hill in 1864, both of Sumner's legs were broken and both of his hips were dislocated by an exploding shell, and a shell fragment hit his head. Although he recovered, he was left with recurrent headaches.

When he was 26, he moved to the Middle Park Basin of Colorado, where he established a trading post consisting of a two-room log cabin overlooking what was then called the Grand River and is now the Colorado River, and catering to trappers and Ute people. A year later, Powell met Sumner while traveling down the river, and enlisted him to participate in the exploration of the Grand Canyon.

== Expedition ==
In 1869, when Sumner was 29 years old, the expedition to the Grand Canyon took place, with Sumner appointed by Powell as his deputy. Getting underway at 1 p.m. on May 24, the expedition party consisted of a total of ten men, traveling along the river in four wooden boats. The lead boat, called the Emma Dean, carried Powell, Sumner, and Bill Dunn. Sumner kept a daily journal of the trip.

On June 8, as the expedition was paddling along the Green River in the Lodore Canyon, an accident occurred. The boat the No Name hit a series of rocks in a rapid and was destroyed, losing food supplies and scientific instruments. Sumner was able to rescue all three men on that boat by getting each of them to grab onto his boat. In July, a Nebraska newspaper printed an erroneous story that the entire expedition had been drowned, with Sumner the sole survivor.

On August 28, an incident occurred that would haunt Sumner for the rest of his life. As the rapids were becoming increasingly difficult to navigate and food rations were running out, Dunn and the brothers Oramel and Seneca Howland decided to leave the expedition, climb the canyon, and walk to a Mormon settlement. They disappeared, and later the three were discovered killed. There were conflicting reports as to whether they had been killed by members of the Shivwits tribe who mistakenly thought that they were some miners who had recently murdered a woman, or by Mormon missionaries who thought that they were hostile Federal agents. Sumner was deeply upset that he had not dissuaded them from leaving the expedition and striking out on their own.

== Later life ==
Upon completion of the expedition, Powell and Sumner held one another in high esteem and considered themselves to be friends. Powell sent Sumner a gift of a fancy watch. However, they subsequently became estranged. Powell rapidly became famous and celebrated, while Sumner found himself with little money or recognition. Sumner resented what he saw as insufficient compensation and credit for the success of the trip, and he believed that Powell exaggerated his own contributions to the expedition while failing to publicly acknowledge Sumner and other members of the crew. He continued to agonize over the deaths of the three men from the expedition.

Sumner had trouble getting enough money to travel home to settle in Grand Junction, Colorado. After arriving, he supported himself as a trapper and prospector, but accumulated debts that eventually made it difficult for him and his siblings to inherit the family farm. He married, but his wife, Alcinda, divorced him in 1884 because of his heavy drinking, only to remarry him eighteen months later. Sumner preferred frontier life to modernity, and cultivated a local reputation as a frontiersman. In April 1901, a Denver newspaper published a partly admiring profile of him that also contained slightly satirical accounts of his unease in urban settings, titled J.C. Sumner Hates Trains and Houses and is Worried by Changes in Denver.

When Powell died in 1902, Sumner sent a letter to The Denver Post, criticizing what he felt were mistakes made by Powell during the trip and Powell's dishonesty in subsequent accounts of what happened. Wallace Stegner has written that many of the accusations in the letter were inaccurate.

In May 1902, Sumner traveled back to the Green River. On May 24, the exact date of the thirty-third anniversary of the first day of the expedition, he walked out of a saloon, down to the side of the river. Using a knife, he slowly and carefully cut off his testicles. He was found the next day, bloody and unconscious, and taken to St. Mary's Hospital in Grand Junction, where his wounds were successfully treated by a surgeon named Knud Hanson. The Rocky Mountain News in Denver reported incorrectly that Sumner had been stabbed during a robbery, but Hanson wrote in his records that "He did this while in a state of despondency." Hanson later wrote that Sumner had performed the castration very precisely, accounting for his survival, and that he may have done so "at a time of supposed temporary insanity". John Ross attributes Sumner's action primarily to his guilt over the deaths of the three men, while Don Lago attributes it primarily to his unhappiness about his overshadowing by Powell.

Sumner survived the incident, and died broke and alone five years later, in 1907, in Vernal, Utah.
