= James Fennemore =

American photographer (1849–1941)

James H. Fennemore (1849–1941) was an American photographer. The Getty Museum has a collection of his work. The Library of Congress also has his work in their collection. The James Fennemore House in Beaver, Utah is listed on the National Register of Historic Places.

== Personal life and career ==
Fennemore was born in London, England. His work includes images of the American West. Fennemore died in Phoenix, Arizona.

He was one of the photographers on John Wesley Powell's 1871 mission down the Colorado River. He was replaced by J. K. Hillers due to ill health. Fennemore worked at a studio in Salt Lake City.

He photographed the scene of John Doyle Lee's execution.
