= Adele Hofmann =

American pediatrician

Adele Hofmann (1926 – 2001) was an American pediatrician. She was a leader in the field of adolescent medicine, co-authoring the field’s authoritative textbook and co-founding two of its leading professional organizations.

== Early life and education ==
Hofmann was born Adele Dellenbaugh in 1926 in Boston, Massachusetts. She was the granddaughter of Frederick Samuel Dellenbaugh, an artist, writer and explorer. She attended Smith College, graduating in 1948, then University of Rochester Medical School, earning her MD in 1952.

== Career ==
Hofmann spent the first 30 years of her career in New York. She pursued her medical training at Babies Hospital of Columbia Presbyterian Medical Center, and then was a National Foundation Fellow in Endocrinology at Presbyterian Hospital. She next worked at Beth Israel Hospital in New York from 1963 to 1970, becoming associate director of the teenage service. She went on to head the pediatric and adolescent medicine programs at New York University, Bellevue Hospital, and St. Luke's Hospital. Later, after moving to California, she worked at Children's Hospital of Orange County (1984 to 1990, as Medical Director of Ambulatory Pediatrics) and the University of California, Irvine (1990 to 1995, as Director of Adolescent Medicine).

Hofmann was a founder of the Society for Adolescent Medicine, serving as its president in 1976-77. The following year she founded the Section on Adolescent Health in the American Academy of Pediatrics. Bringing together knowledge of endocrinology, pediatrics, psychology and general medicine, she led a movement to redefine adolescent medicine as a pediatric specialty.

In 1981, the Society for Adolescent Medicine awarded her its Outstanding Achievement in Adolescent Medicine Award. In 1988 the American Academy of Pediatrics awarded her its Outstanding Achievement Award in Adolescent Health.

Hofmann published widely. She wrote articles on minors' legal rights, adolescent behavior and sexuality, and young people with special risks. Her books included The Hospitalized Adolescent (1976), with a foreword from Anna Freud; this won an award from the American Nurses Association. In 1984 she published Consent and Confidentiality in Child and Adolescent Care and 1986, with Donald Graydanus, Hofmann published the definitive textbook for her field, Adolescent Medicine. It won an award from the American College of Internal Medicine the following year and as of 2001 remained in print at McGraw Hill.

== Personal life ==
She married Frederick G. Hofmann and they had two children. She and Frederick subsequently divorced.

Hofmann died of congestive heart failure on June 15, 2001, in a hospital in Newport Beach, California, near her home in Laguna Beach. She was 74.

== Legacy ==
The Society for Adolescent Health and Medicine offers an annual visiting professorship award named for Hofmann. The American Academy of Pediatrics' Section on Adolescent Health also gives an award named for her.
