= Sam Adams (explorer) =

American explorer

- Born: October 20, 1828; Beaver, Pennsylvania
- Died: May 15, 1915 (aged 86)
- Occupation: Explorer

Sam Adams (1828 – May 15, 1915) who referred to himself as "Captain", was an early explorer of the American west, who claimed to explore the Colorado River over a number of years. He made a number of unsubstantiated claims and sought to get $20,000 from the government, which was never paid. He returned to Pennsylvania and worked as a lawyer.

== Early life ==
Samuel Adams was born in Beaver, Pennsylvania, on October 20, 1828. His mother was Cynthia Darragh, whose great-grandfather was John Hart, a signer of the Declaration of Independence. His father was Dr. Milo Adams (1790–1846). Adams descended from Captain Benjamin Adams, an officer in the American Revolutionary War. He studied at the old academy at Beaver, Pennsylvania. He studied law and became a member of the bar in Pennsylvania in 1853. He practiced for many years in Des Moines, Iowa.

== Colorado River survey ==
In 1864, Adams was head of a Colorado River freighting company, Union Line. He sought to send freight along the Colorado River by steamship, but his business did not become viable.

From 1864 to 1869, Adams surveyed the Colorado River and its tributaries. He produced a report, which he delivered to the War Department in 1869 and requested reimbursement of expenses of $20,000. (Note: It is also stated that he explored the Colorado River over a four year period, beginning in 1864. Adams said in his report that he began the survey at the request of the Secretary of War, Edwin Stanton.) Adams claimed that during the exploration, he found a place he called "Paradise Valley" that had fields of grain seven feet high; that he had found gold, copper, lead, and silver; and that the Colorado River was freely navigable for 600 miles from its mouth. During the same period, John Wesley Powell conducted a more extensive survey. When asked about Adams' report, Powell found many of the statements to be inaccurate, including a claim that Adams first surveyed an area that was surveyed in 1857 by Joseph C. Ives.

Adams struggled for over ten years to impose his view of the Colorado River - that it was a mineral paradise shot through with veins of gold and silver - but ultimately failed. In 1878, Senator Francis Cockrell rejected a resolution that would have compensated Adams for his spontaneous work. Adams' survey, while wildly off the mark and generally recognized as unscientific, was a notable moment in the exploration of the West. In the words of Powell biographer Wallace Stegner, it was a "symptom. In his resistance to fact and logic he had many allies who were neither so foolish in their folly nor so witless in their rascality as he, but whose justification and platform was the same incorrigible insistence upon a West that did not exist."

== Route to Pacific Ocean ==
In 1869, he told residents of Breckenridge, Colorado, that he believed he had found a route from the Rocky Mountains to the Pacific Ocean via the Colorado River. He was able to arrange for boats to be built and a team of eleven to take the trip with him. They set off on the Blue River, a tributary of the Colorado River, but were unsuccessful in reaching the Colorado. The boats broke apart and the men left Adams.

== Later years ==
At the end of his life he resettled in his hometown where he practiced law. He died on May 15, 1915, in Beaver Falls, Pennsylvania, as the oldest member of the Pennsylvania bar. (Note: One source for his date of death states that he died on May 11th and on May 17th.)
