= Report on the Lands of the Arid Region of the United States =

Report submitted by John Wesley Powell in 1878

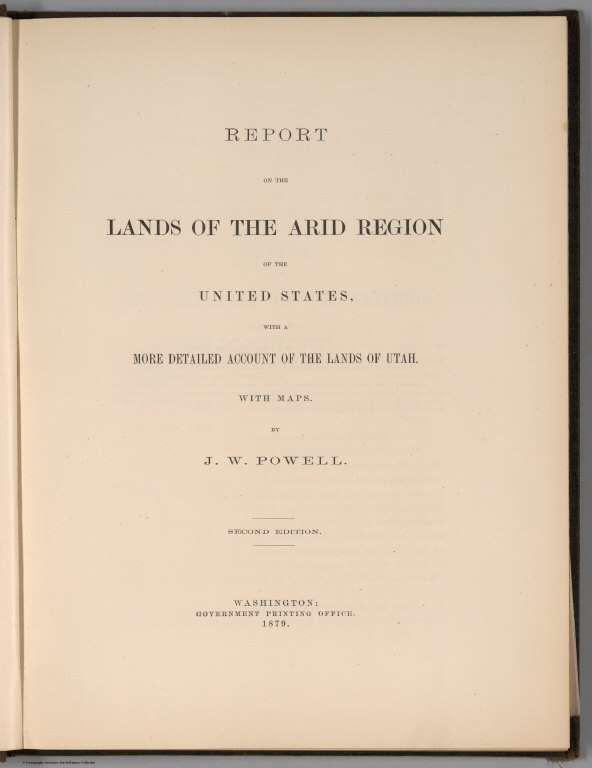
Title page of J.W. Powell's 1879 Report on the Lands of the Arid Region of the United States.

The Report on the Lands of the Arid Region of the United States is a scientific report and policy recommendation written by the American explorer, geologist, and anthropologist John Wesley Powell, with contributions by Grove Karl Gilbert, Clarence Dutton, Almon Harris Thompson, and Willis Drummond, Jr. It was published in 1879 and summarized much of the work that had been carried out over the previous decade under the auspices of the Powell Survey. It is notable for including a series of policy critiques and proposals by Powell designed to create an equitable and sustainable legal framework for settling the western United States.

The work begins with a detailed account of the climate of the western United States based on Smithsonian climate data and Powell's own observations. Powell then describes the extent and potential of the region's "irrigable lands," "timber lands," and "pasturage lands." He goes on to summarize and critique the system of land distribution under the Homestead Acts, and he proposes two new laws that would modify the existing system by enabling cooperative management of water resources. The remaining chapters go into technical detail about topics such as rainfall and irrigation, and describe specific drainage basins studied by the authors.

The report's proposals were largely ignored by Congress until 1886, when a series of extreme weather events temporarily restored interest in some of them. Still, it was not until the 20th century that many historians and commentators came to hail Powell's remarks as 'prophetic.'

== Policy critiques and proposals ==
Illustration titled "Rain Chart of the United States," prepared by Charles A. Schott for inclusion in the Report on the Lands of the Arid Region.

Powell begins by defining the "Arid Region" as the approximately 40% of the continental U.S. that receives on average less than 20 inches of rainfall annually and within which agriculture without irrigation is impossible. He then goes on to define three sub-categories of land within the Arid Region based on their potential for economic use: "the irrigable lands below, the forest lands above, and the pasturage lands between."

Having established the scarcity of water west of 100° W, Powell points out the inadequacies of the Homestead Act of 1862 and related laws for distributing land within the region. The Homestead Act allowed individuals over the age of 21 to claim up to 160 acres of land in the public domain and was administered by the United States General Land Office. As had been done in the eastern United States, the Land Office typically surveyed, platted, and sold western lands in the form of square parcels that bore no relationship to their underlying topography. Powell argues that this technique ran the risk of concentrating valuable water resources on single plots, leaving adjacent plots unable to be settled, farmed or used for pasturage. He also makes the case that 160-acre plots were far too small to support grazing due to the region's sparse vegetation.

Colored map of Utah Territory that accompanied the Report on the Lands of the Arid Region showing the approximate extent of irrigable lands, standing timber, and "Area destitute of Timber on account of Fires."

Powell then proposes that settlements in the Arid Region consist of cooperative communities, similar to those of the Mormons, Pueblos, and Hispanic New Mexicans. In the case of the irrigable lands, "irrigation districts" would allow groups to pool the capital for the irrigation projects necessary to draw water from large rivers. Elsewhere, "grazing districts" would allow for the grouping of dwellings and public buildings, and for mutual access to the small amounts of irrigated land needed to raise hay. Powell presents two pieces of draft legislation that would have enabled collectives of 9 or more individuals to create their own irrigation or grazing districts with maximum individual allotment sizes of 80 acres and 2,560 acres respectively. These cooperative districts would have been empowered to establish their own bylaws, the idea being that members would hold one another accountable to prevent the monopolization of water.

In order to further ensure a democratic division of water, Powell insists that water rights not be separated from the land they were used to irrigate to prevent developers from monopolizing water and extorting landowners.

In order to effectively carry out his proposed reforms, Powell recommends that the lands of the Arid Region be surveyed and classified as irrigable lands, timber lands, pasturage lands, mineral lands, and coal lands. A colored map of Utah Territory accompanied the report, illustrating the approximate extent of some of these divisions.

== Portrayal of Native Americans ==
In his discussion of "timber lands," Powell goes into detail about the prevalence of forest fires in the Arid Region. He blames the majority of these fires on Native Americans, writing:

In the main these fires are set by Indians. Driven from the lowlands by advancing civilization, they resort to the higher regions until they are forced back by the deep snows of winter. Want, caused by the restricted area to which they resort for food; the desire for luxuries to which they were strangers in their primitive condition, and especially the desire for personal adornment, together with a supply of more effective instruments for hunting and trapping, have in late years, during the rapid settlement of the country since the discovery of gold and the building of railroads, greatly stimulated the pursuit of animals for their furs—the wealth and currency of the savage. On their hunting excursions they systematically set fire to forests for the purpose of driving the game . . . The fires can, then, be very greatly curtailed by the removal of the Indians.

Powell's views on forest fires and Native hunting practices changed later in his career. In "The Non-Irrigable Lands of the Arid Region," an article for Century Magazine published in 1890, he reflects,

Some years ago I mapped the forests of Utah, and found that about one half had been thus consumed since the occupation of the country by civilized man . . . Before the white man came the natives systematically burned over the forest lands with each recurrent year as one of their great hunting economies. By this process little destruction of timber was accomplished; but, protected by civilized men, forests are rapidly disappearing.

== Reception and subsequent events ==
The publication of the Report on the Lands of the Arid Regions of the United States added to Powell's reputation as an authority on the western United States, but the document was not without its detractors. Powell's implication that rain patterns are determined by geography contradicted the idea that rain follows the plow, which was widely propagated by politicians, scientists, railroad corporations, and proponents of manifest destiny. Many individuals also took issue with the report's recommendation that grazing allotments from the public domain be 2,560 acres. Powell saw this size as necessary for cattle to have enough pasturage to survive the arid conditions, but others saw it as supporting wealthier ranchers and powerful investors instead of the average American. Powell's proposals to reform the land laws were ignored by Congress.

However, Powell did win a parallel legal battle to consolidate the organizations tasked with surveying the western United States. On March 3, 1879, the same day that a second round of reprinting of the report was ordered, Powell's survey of the west was merged with two other competing expeditions to create the United States Geological Survey with Powell's peer and friend Clarence King as its first director. Powell was put in charge of the newly created Bureau of American Ethnology. In 1881, upon King's resignation, Powell was also appointed the second director of the Geological Survey. In these positions, Powell led efforts to catalog the languages and belief systems of Native Americans, the existence of which was being threatened by settlers and government attempts at assimilation, and to further study the geographic character of the West. Under Powell, from 1881 to 1884, the Geological Survey became the largest scientific organization of its type in the world.
