= James Pilling =

American ethnologist (1846–1895)

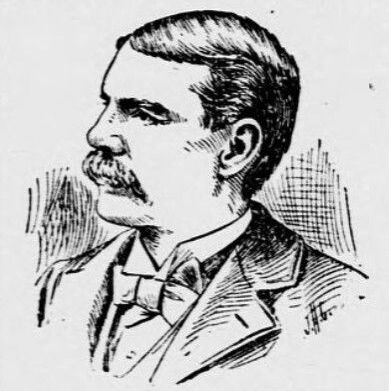
- Born: November 16, 1846; Washington, D.C.
- Died: July 26, 1895 (aged 48)
- Occupation: Philologist

James Constantine Pilling (November 16, 1846, in Washington, D.C. – July 26, 1895) was an American Congressional stenographer-transcriptionist and a pioneering ethnologist chiefly known for compiling a series of extensive bibliographies of the cultures, mythologies and languages of the North and Central American aboriginal peoples. Beginning in 1875, when he joined the survey of the American West led by Maj. John Wesley Powell, and continuing through 1881, Pilling did extensive fieldwork and proofread Powell's Report on the lands of the arid region of the United States (1879).

== Education and early work ==
Pilling attended Gonzaga College, at the time chartered by Congress to offer university degrees but today a Jesuit high school. Having taught himself Pitman shorthand while still in grade school, he became highly proficient as a stenographer, later working for several government agencies.

== Ethnology career ==
In 1875, John Wesley Powell hired him to help administer the United States Geological Survey (USGS) of the Rocky Mountain regions. In 1879, when Powell founded the Bureau of Ethnology (known from 1897 to 1965 as the Bureau of American Ethnology or BAE), Pilling became the bureau's chief clerk. When Powell took over as director of the USGS and of the BAE from Clarence King (1881), Pilling became the USGS chief clerk as well, while continuing his work with the BAE. In his unpaid hours over the next 15 years Pilling compiled an extensive bibliography of books and manuscripts on North American languages. He was also responsible for the initial development of the BAE library and for maintaining its archives system. By 1891, a debilitating illness he had contracted during his years of ethnological fieldwork forced him to resign from such administrative duties, but he continued his ethnology work until his death in 1895.

In 1885, the BAE published his labour of love as the 1,200-page Proof-sheets of a Bibliography of North American Indian Languages; only 100 copies were printed. Scholars of American Indian languages, however, gave the work an enthusiastic reception, and their cooperation enabled Pilling subsequently to revise this monumental work and publish a series of bibliographies, each dealing with a particular family of Amerindian languages. Organizing his data sets in card catalogues and using a cross-reference system, between 1887 and 1894, Pilling published revised bibliographies of Eskimo–Aleut, Siouan–Catawban, Iroquoian, Muskogean, Algonquian, Athabaskan, Chinookan, Salishan, and Wakashan language families (Bureau of American Ethnology Bulletins 1, 5, 6, 9, 13, 14, 15, 16, and 19).

In addition, Pilling had compiled much of the material for a proposed bibliography of Mexican languages, which was not published during his lifetime. Now known as the Uto-Aztecan languages, their kinship was conclusively established by Edward Sapir in the 1920s, but Powell had opposed such a classification scheme. Pilling's Shoshonean languages are now known as Northern Uto-Aztecan, while his Sonoran and Aztec groupings are now both considered among the Southern Uto-Aztecan languages.

Pilling died of locomotor ataxia, now called Tabes dorsalis, a disease associated with untreated syphilis, in 1895.
