= Tau-gu =

19th century headman of the Southern Paiutes from Arizona

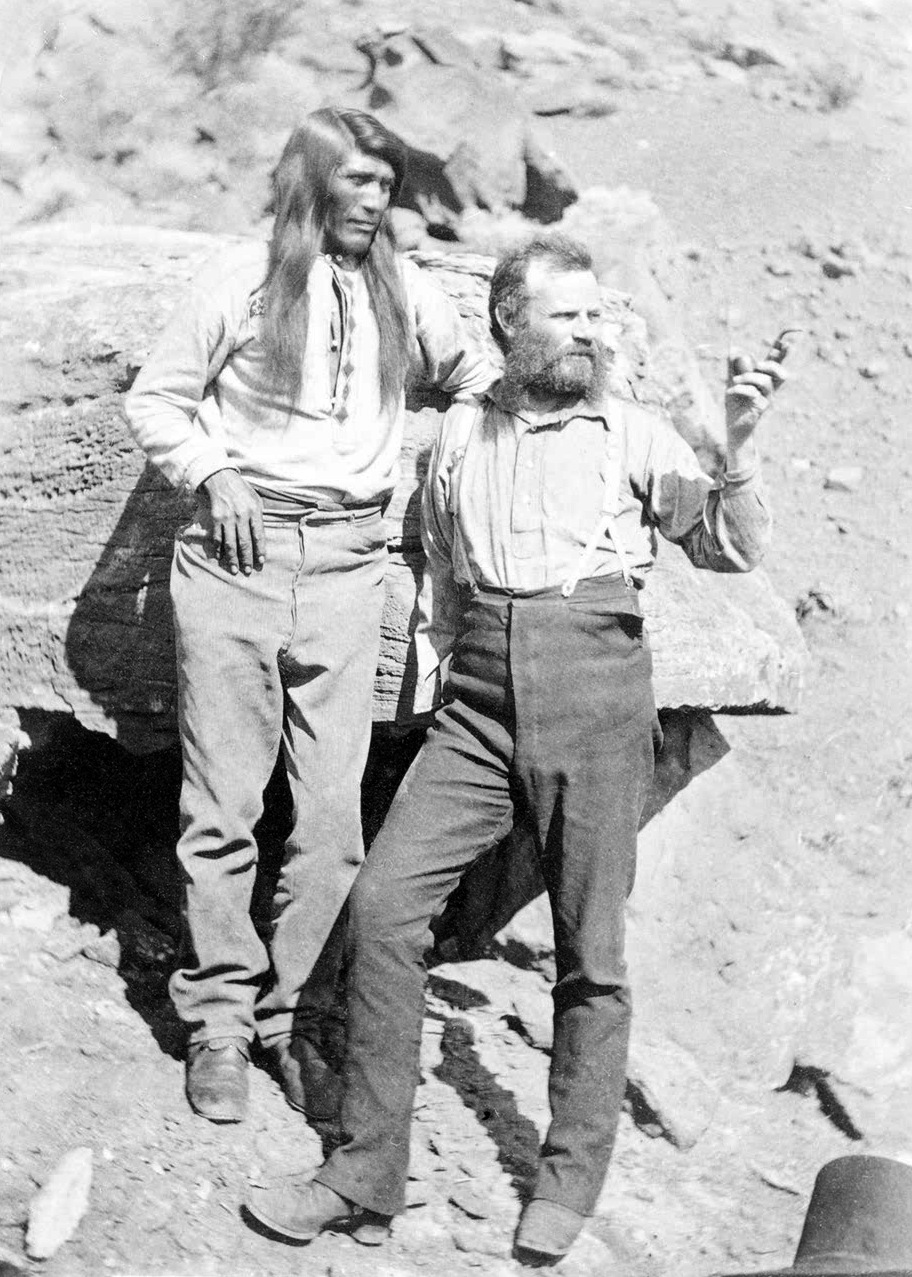
Tau-gu with John Wesley Powell, near the Virgin River, ca. 1873

Tau-gu was a headman of the Southern Paiutes in Arizona in the 1870s.
