= John Karl Hillers =

American photographer (1843–1925)

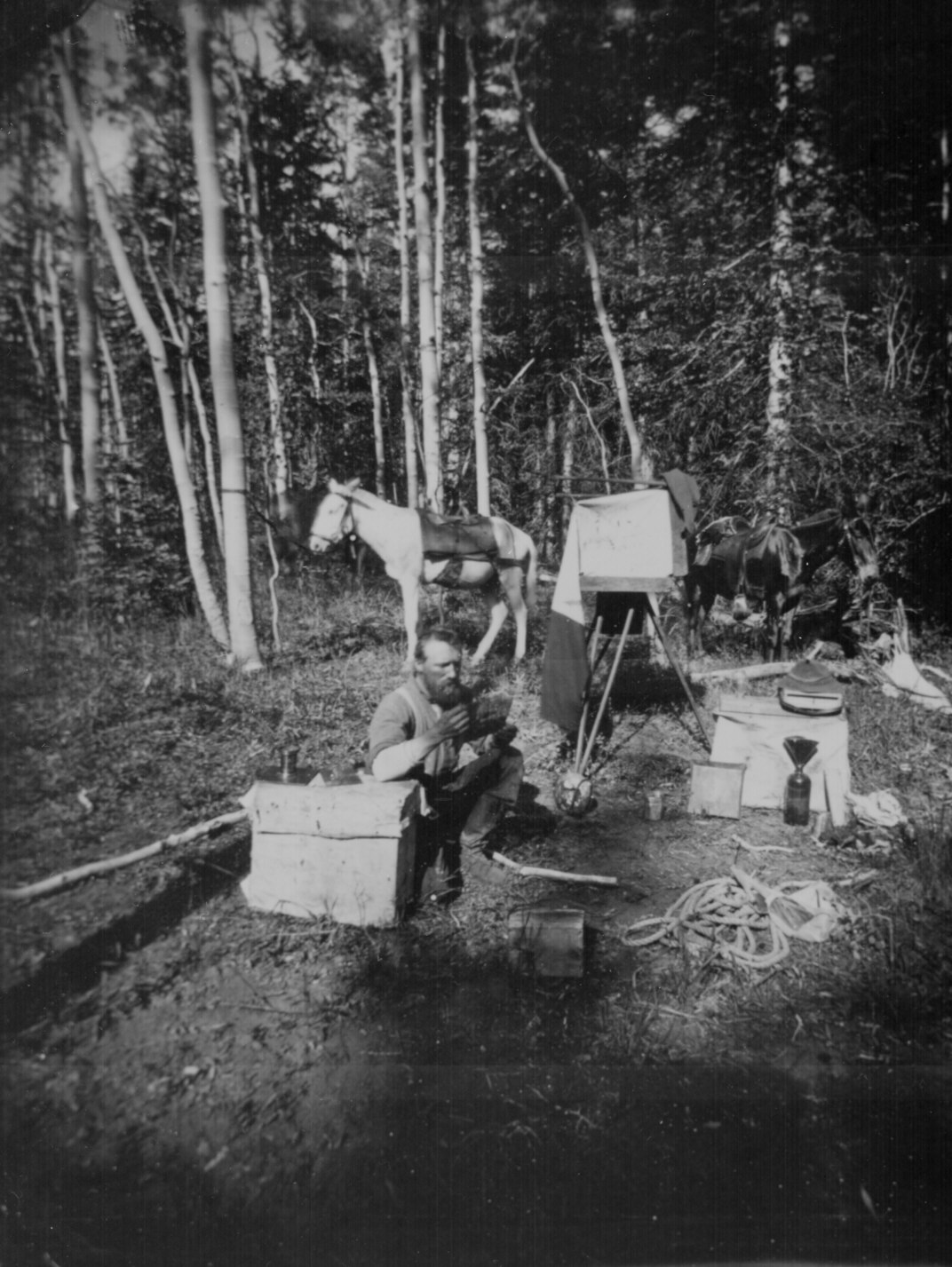
Hillers at work with his negatives. In camp, Aquarius Plateau, Utah Territory, ca 1872

John Karl Hillers (1843, Hanover, Germany – 1925) was an American government photographer.

Hillers came to the United States in 1852. He was a policeman and then a soldier in the American Civil War, first with the New York Naval Brigade, then in the army, he re-enlisted after the war and served with the Western garrisons until 1870. He worked as a teamster in Salt Lake City, when he met John Wesley Powell.

Originally hired as a boatman for the second Powell expedition down the Colorado River in 1871, Hillers began to replace Walter Clement Powell, John W. Powell's cousin and assistant to the expedition's photographers, first to E.O. Beaman and then to James Fennemore.

Hillers was Powell's chief expedition photographer on the trip down the Grand Canyon the next year.

He went on to spend twenty years exploring and photographing the American West, and is known particularly for his portraits of Native Americans.

He was the first staff photographer of Powell's Bureau of Ethnology (from 1879) and after returning to Powell's US Geological Survey in 1881 continued Bureau of American Ethnology work until he resigned in 1900. Although he officially retired in 1900, he continued to take photographs for the United States Geological Survey until 1919.

He was the photographer of the first James Stevenson expedition to the Southwest, which brought Frank H. Cushing to Zuni.

3,000 negatives from the Powell Surveys and 20,000 negatives from his association with the Bureau of Ethnology have been credited to John K. Hillers.

John Karl Hillers is the namesake of Mount Hillers, in Utah.

== Sources ==
- William Culp Darrah: Beaman, Fennemore, Hillers, Dellenbaugh, Johnson, and Hattan, in: Utah Historical Quarterly, Vol. 17, Nos. 1-4, 1949, pp. 491–503.
- Don. D. Fowler: ′Photographed All the Best Scenery′: Jack Hillers' Diary of the Powell Expeditions, 1871–1875, University of Utah Press, Salt Lake City, 1972.
- Don D.Fowler: The Western Photographs of John K. Hillers: ′Myself in the Water′, Smithsonian Institution Press, Washington, D.C., 1989. ISBN 0-87474-441-5
- Don. D. Fowler: Cleaving an Unknown World: The Powell Expeditions and the Scientific Exploration of the Colorado Plateau, University of Utah Press, Salt Lake City, 2012. (updated publication containing Hillers' diary and photography). ISBN 978-1-60781-146-6
