= John F. Ross (author) =

American historian and author

- Writing career
- Notable work: Enduring Courage
- Notable awards: 2011 Fort Ticonderoga Award for Contributions to American History
- Website: johnfross.com

John F. Ross is an American historian and author. He is the recipient of the 2011 Fort Ticonderoga Award for Contributions to American History.

== Career ==
The author of over 200 articles, Ross' works have appeared in Smithsonian, The Atlantic, The New York Times, The Wall Street Journal, Outside, and The Washington Post. He has reported from Greenland, Siberia, Galapagos, Panama, Thailand, and Mexico. In addition to his written work, Ross has been featured on more than fifty radio and television programs, including PBS's American Experience, NPR's On Point, Science Friday, C-SPAN, the Discovery Channel, the John Batchelor Show, and the Pritzker Military Presents. He has spoken at the Smithsonian's Natural History Museum, NASA, the Explorers Club, and Cosmos Club.

Ross was the former Executive Editor of American Heritage and has served on the Board of Editors at Smithsonian Magazine.

=== Promise of the Grand Canyon ===
Ross' fifth book, The Promise of the Grand Canyon: John Wesley Powell's Perilous Journey and His Vision for the American West (Viking, July 2018), is the account of John Wesley Powell who, as an explorer, dared to lead the first successful expedition down the Colorado through the Grand Canyon, and, as a visionary, waged a bitterly contested campaign for environmental sustainability.

The Washington Post says "Ross tells Powell's story powerfully, sprinkled with quotes from the explorer-geologist's diary and a feeling of dramatic suspense—will he survive?—even though we know the outcome."

TIME interviewed Ross on the occasion of the 100th anniversary of the Grand Canyon National Park on February 26, 2019. And, The National featured a story about Ross' research trip down the Colorado River with his family.

=== Enduring Courage ===
His book Enduring Courage: Ace Pilot Eddie Rickebacker and the Dawn of the Age of Speed (St. Martin's Press, 2014) tells the true story of Eddie Rickenbacker, America's greatest flying ace during World War I. Ross details how Rickenbacker overcame class hostility and a lack of formal education, pushing redefining the nature of speed in American society to become one of America's greatest race car drivers and pilots.

In an interview about Enduring Courage, Ross explains his fascination with Rickenbacker:

I was hooked at age 10 or 12 when I read his first autobiography, Fighting the Flying Circus. I was just stunned by the incredible stories of aerial dogfights in rickety biplanes over France in World War I, and how Eddie Rickenbacker was the hero at the center of it. As I got older I began to wonder: Who was this guy? How did he stay alive and what drove him? What was his nature and how did he look at life? Where did his courage come from?

The Wall Street Journal has praised Ross for skill in depicting the reality of World War I air combat and how pilots' dangerous experiences differed from the more romantic ideas surrounding flight at the time. The Wall Street Journal similarly hailed Ross' earlier book, War on the Run: The Epic Story of Robert Rogers and the Conquest of America's First Frontier, as a "lively, evocative and at times moving biography" of the man who is the godfather of Special Operations.

== Published works ==
- Living Dangerously: Navigating the Risks of Everyday Life (Perseus, 1999) ISBN 0738203211 OCLC 46868075 It was also published under the title The Polar Bear Strategy.
- War on the Run: The Epic Story of Robert Rogers and the Conquest of America's First Frontier (Random House, 2009) ISBN 9780553804966 OCLC 262433273
- Enduring Courage: Ace Pilot Eddie Rickenbacker and the Dawn of the Age of Speed (St. Martin's Press, 2014) ISBN 9781250033772 OCLC 857982343
- The Promise of the Grand Canyon: John Wesley Powell's Perilous Journey and His Vision for the American West (Viking, 2018) ISBN 0525429875

== Awards ==
- 2011 Fort Ticonderoga Award for Contributions to American History
- 2009 Harryman Dorsey Periodical Article Award from the Society of Colonial Wars for "Battle of Carillon" in American Heritage, Spring/Summer 2008
