= Frederick Samuel Dellenbaugh =

American explorer (1853–1935)

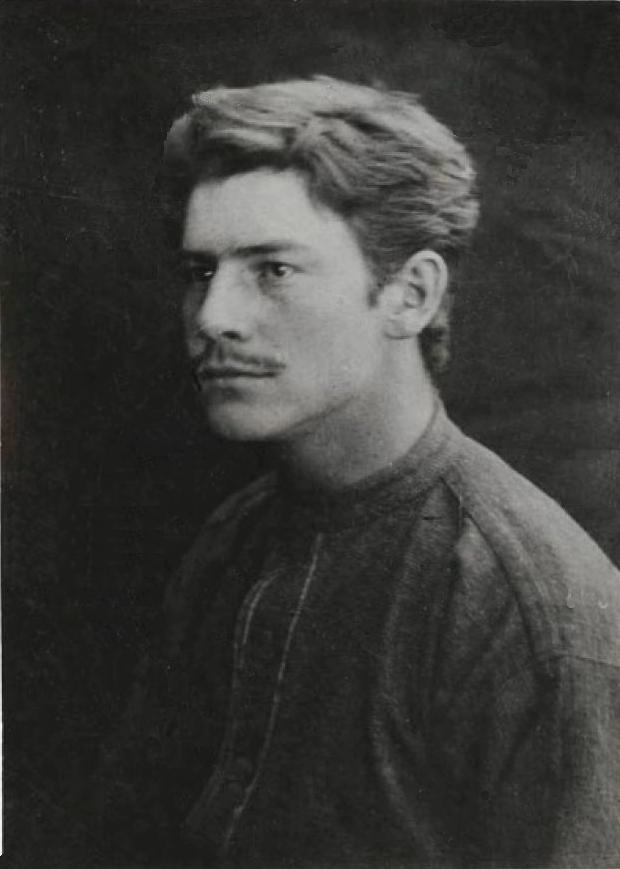
Dellenbaugh in 1872

Frederick Samuel Dellenbaugh (September 13, 1853 – January 29, 1935) was an American explorer.

== Biography ==
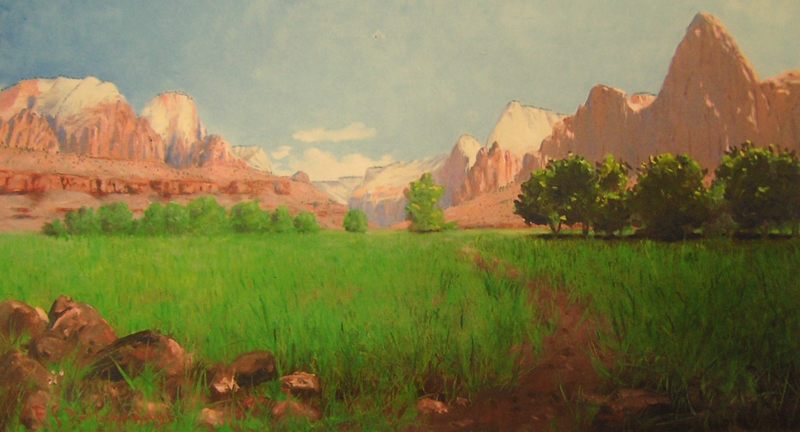
Painting of Zion Canyon, by Dellenbaugh, 1903

He was born in McConnelsville, Ohio on September 13, 1853, and was educated in the United States and in Europe. An explorer of the American West at an early age, he was a member of an expedition that discovered the last unknown river in the United States, the Escalante River and the previously undiscovered Henry Mountains.

From 1871 to 1873, he was artist and assistant topographer with Major Powell's second expedition down the Colorado River. He joined the 1899 Harriman Alaska Expedition financed by railroad magnate E. H. Harriman. He served as librarian of the American Geographical Society (1909–1911), and became a fellow of the American Ethnological Society. He helped to found the Explorers Club in 1904.

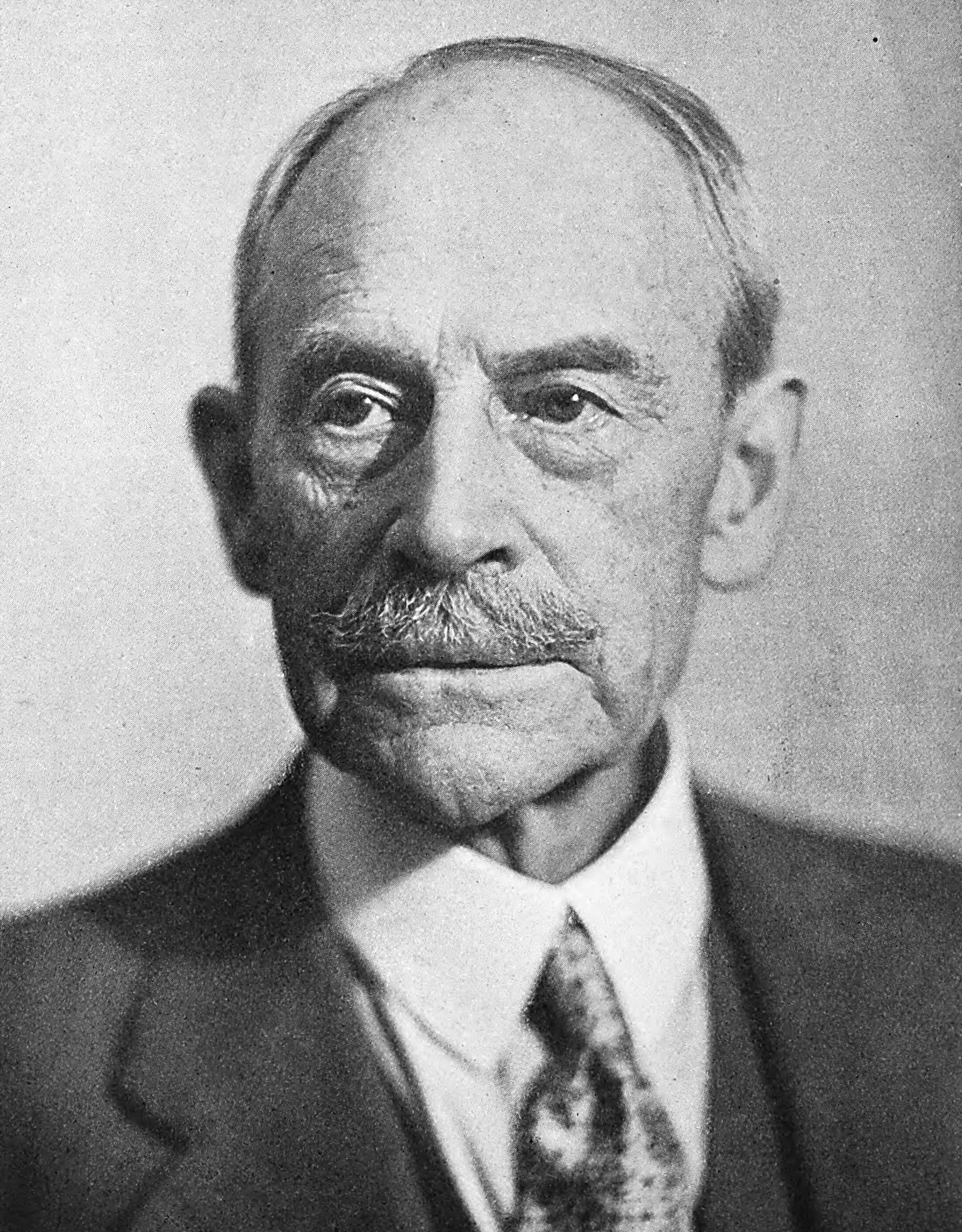
Portrait by Will Connell c. 1929

Dellenbaugh died of pneumonia on January 29, 1935, and was buried in the Otis family plot in Ellenville, New York.

Dellenbaugh is the namesake of Dellenbaugh Butte, in Utah.

== Publications ==
- The North Americans of Yesterday (1900)
- The Romance of the Colorado River (1902; third edition, 1909)
- Breaking the Wilderness (1905)
- In the Amazon Jungle (1908); by Algot Lange (Introduction by Dellenbaugh)
- A Canyon Voyage (1908; second edition, 1926)
- Frémont and '49 (1913; second edition, 1914)
- George Armstrong Custer (1917)
