= Emma Dean Powell =

American naturalist (1835–1924)

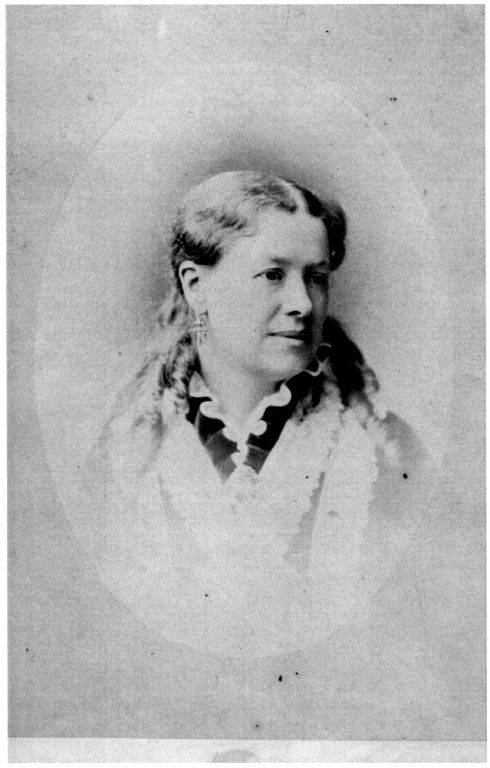
- Born: July 7, 1835; New York City, United States
- Died: March 13, 1924 (aged 88); Washington, D.C., United States
- Spouse: John Wesley Powell
- Scientific career
- Fields: botany; ornithology

Harriet Emma Dean Powell (July 7, 1835 – March 13, 1924) was an American botanist and ornithologist, and the wife of John Wesley Powell. She accompanied and cared for him after the loss of his arm during the Civil War and was with him during many of his trips to explore the Western United States serving as a scientific assistant collecting samples. John Wesley Powell's personal vessel for the 1869 Powell Geographic Expedition was named the Emma Dean in her honor.

== Early life ==
Harriet Emma Dean was born on July 7, 1835, in New York City to Joseph Dean, a hat maker, and Harriet Head. By 1855, her family moved to Detroit, Michigan, where her half cousin, John Wesley Powell, would visit when she was 18. In 1862, after Powell had enlisted in the Illinois Infantry, he received a short leave to go to Detroit to marry Emma Dean and she accompanied him back to camp after their wedding.

== Civil War and Western expeditions ==
John Wesley Powell lost his right arm below the elbow during the Battle of Shiloh, Emma Dean received permission from General Ulysses S. Grant to accompany her husband to battlefield camps to tend and assist him. She remained his nurse and assistant and served as a battlefield nurse until Powell's honorable discharge.

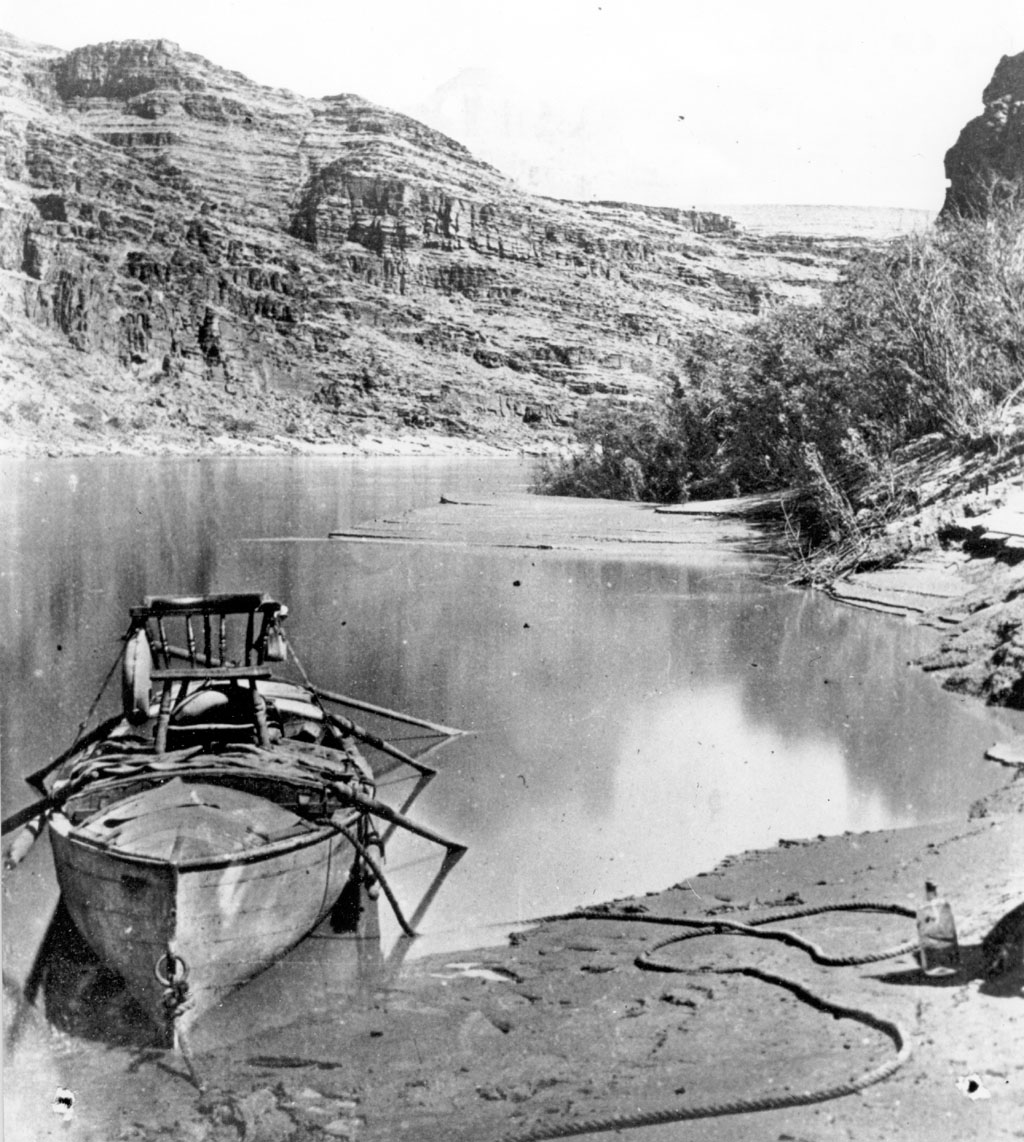
John Wesley Powell's boat, the Emma Dean, named for his wife

After the Civil War, Powell returned to teaching and Emma accompanied him and his students on geologic and nature field trips in the 1860s and 1870s. Throughout 1868 and 1869 Powell surveyed the Colorado Territory. While most of their party returned east during the fall, Powell and what remained of his colleagues, built cabins for a winter camp in the Rockies along the White River. Emma was on the expedition as well, the only woman in the party. During this expedition, she served as assistant ornithologist and prepared around 175 specimens for study.

John Wesley Powell's 1869 Geographic Expedition was difficult and fraught with equipment and supply losses. At one point, the expedition members had not been heard from in months, and some presumed them dead, particularly in the media due to reports from a John A. Risdon. In the summer of 1869, some papers reported Risdon's claim that he saw the exploration party destroyed on May 8. Emma Dean sent out multiple notes stating the story was a fabrication, as she had been present for part of the expedition, and had received letters dated after the date of the supposed demise. She also stated that no party members or those connected with it otherwise, were named John A. Risdon.

== Ornithology ==
In March 1867, Powell ascended 14,115-foot (4,302 m) Pikes Peak and in 1868 served as ornithologist during an exploration where she catalogued 175 species of birds they collected. Powell's catalogue likely included species such as the Golden Eagle, Mountain Bluebird, and Broad-tailed hummingbird which are all species native to Pike's Peak. Fourteen bird skins (used for taxidermy) in the Smithsonian's collection are attributed to Powell from her 1867 expedition.

== Later life ==
On September 10, 1871, Emma Dean gave birth to the Powells' only child, Mary Dean Powell in Salt Lake City, Utah. She was active in the Wimodaughsis, a national women's club in Washington, D.C., started by Anna Howard Shaw and Susan B. Anthony. Emma Dean Powell died on March 13, 1924, in Washington, D.C. She is buried along with her husband in Arlington National Cemetery.
