= John Wesley Powell =

American geologist and explorer (1834–1902)

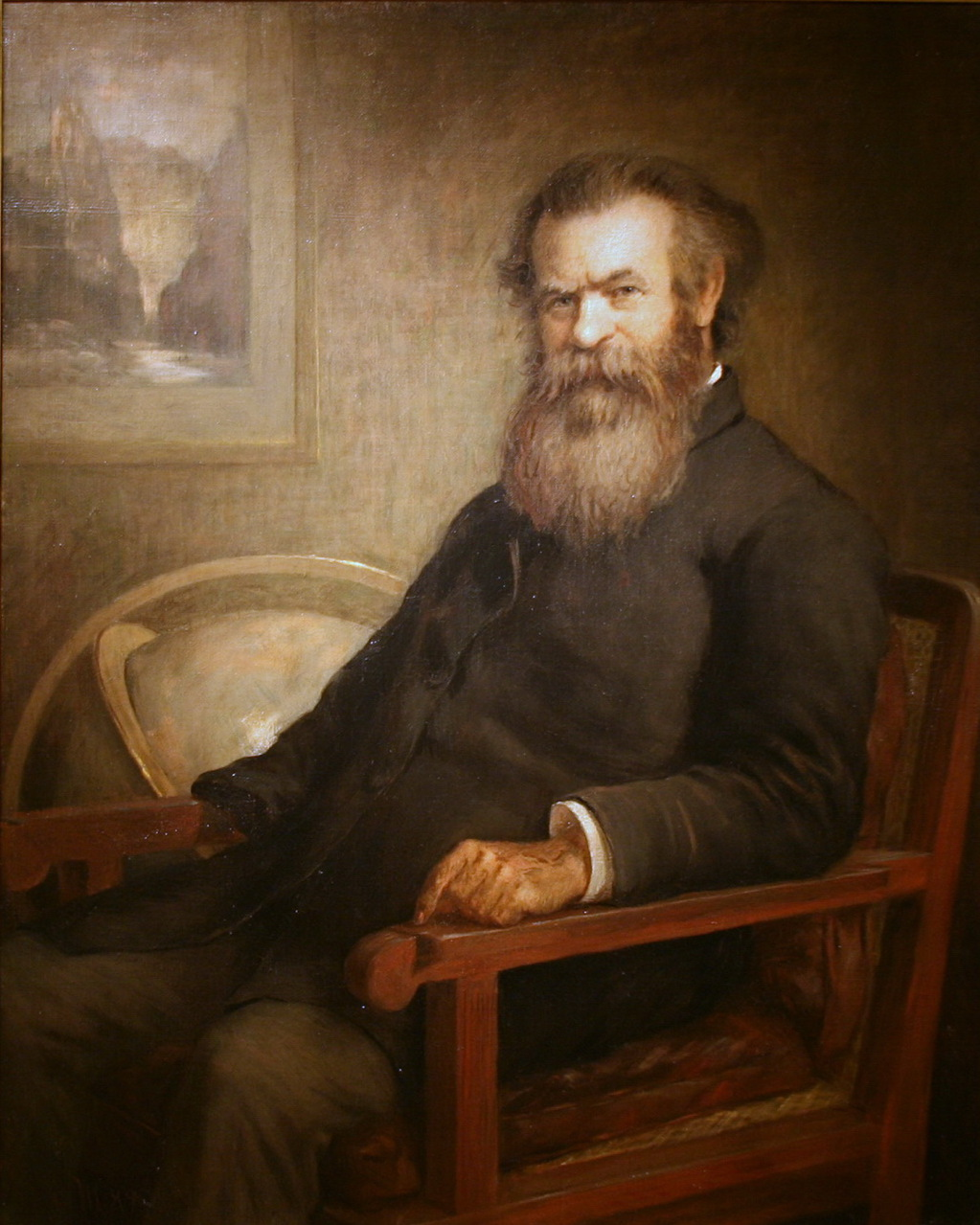
- Powell as he appears at the National Portrait Gallery in Washington, D.C.

2nd Director of the United States Geological Survey
- In office 1881 – 1894
- Preceded by: Clarence King
- Succeeded by: Charles Doolittle Walcott

Personal details
- Born: March 24, 1834 Mount Morris, New York, U.S.
- Died: September 23, 1902 (aged 68) Haven Colony, Brooklin, Maine, U.S.
- Resting place: Arlington National Cemetery, Section 1
- Spouse: Emma Dean Powell
- Relatives: William B Powell, brother. Walter H Powell, brother
- Known for: Traversing Colorado River of the Grand Canyon
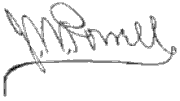
- Signature
- Scientific career
- Education: Illinois College; Oberlin College
- Fields: Natural sciences
- Workplaces: Illinois Wesleyan University; Illinois State Normal University; U.S. Geological Survey; Smithsonian Institution
- Military career
- Allegiance: United States of America
- Branch: United States Army
- Service years: 1861–1865
- Rank: Major

John Wesley Powell (March 24, 1834 – September 23, 1902) was a U.S. Army soldier, explorer of the American West, and director of major scientific and cultural institutions. He is famous for his 1869 geographic expedition, a three-month river trip down the Green and Colorado rivers, including the first official U.S. government-sponsored passage through the Grand Canyon.

Powell was appointed by US president James A. Garfield to serve as the second director of the U.S. Geological Survey (1881–1894) and proposed, for development of the arid West, policies that were prescient for his accurate evaluation of conditions. He also spent time among the Native Peoples of the Colorado Plateau and wrote an influential classification of North American Indian languages. Two years prior to his service as director of the U.S. Geological Survey, he had become the first director of the Bureau of Ethnology at the Smithsonian Institution where he supported linguistic and sociological research and publications. He was also the first president of the Anthropological Society of Washington, founded in 1879.

Powell was a proponent of Lewis H. Morgan's stages of human progress, and regarded Native Americans as culturally savage or barbarian. He advocated for overthrow of indigenous societies and the gradual replacement of native hunting practices with sedentary agriculture, as well as the cultural assimilation of Native people into the United States. Powell was in favor of developing agriculture on water-rich public lands, leaving the rest for grazing animals.

From 1894 to 1899, Powell held a post as lecturer on the History of Culture in the Political Science department at the Columbian University in Washington, D.C. He was elected a member of the American Antiquarian Society in 1898.

== Early life ==
Powell was born in Mount Morris, New York, in 1834, the son of Joseph and Mary Powell. His father, a poor itinerant preacher, had emigrated to the U.S. from Shrewsbury, England, in 1831. His family moved westward to Jackson, Ohio, then to Walworth County, Wisconsin, before settling in rural Boone County, Illinois.

As a young man he undertook a series of adventures through the Mississippi River valley. In 1855, he spent four months walking across Wisconsin. During 1856, he rowed the Mississippi from St. Anthony, Minnesota, to the sea. In 1857, he rowed down the Ohio River from Pittsburgh to the Mississippi River, traveling north to reach St. Louis. In 1858, he rowed down the Illinois River, then up the Mississippi and the Des Moines River to central Iowa. In 1859, at age 25, he was elected to the Illinois Natural History Society.

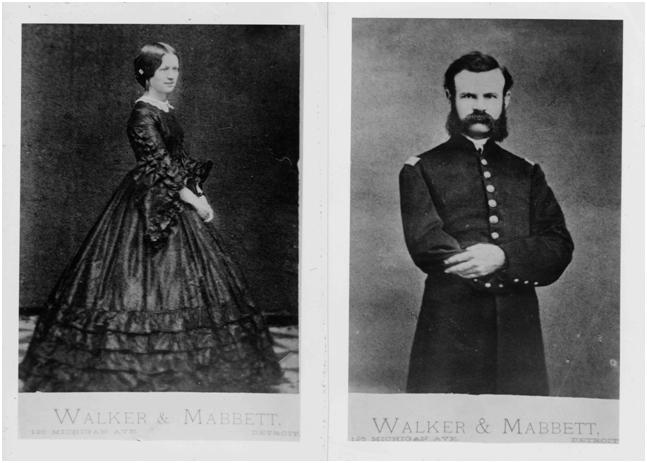
John Wesley Powell and his wife, Emma, in Detroit in 1863.

Powell studied at Illinois College, Illinois Institute (which would later become Wheaton College), and Oberlin College, over a period of seven years while teaching, but was unable to attain his degree. While at Illinois College, he was a member of Sigma Pi Literary Society.

During his studies Powell acquired a knowledge of Ancient Greek and Latin. Powell had a restless nature and a deep interest in the natural sciences. This desire to learn about natural sciences was against the wishes of his father, yet Powell was still determined to do so. In 1860, when Powell was on a lecture tour, he began to feel that a civil war was inevitable; after enlisting, he decided to study military science and engineering to prepare himself for the conflict.

== Civil War and aftermath ==
Powell's loyalties remained with the Union and the cause of abolishing slavery. On May 8, 1861, he enlisted at Hennepin, Illinois, as a private in the 20th Illinois Infantry. He was elected sergeant-major of the regiment, and when the 20th Illinois was mustered into the Federal service a month later, Powell was commissioned a second lieutenant.

While stationed at Cape Girardeau, Missouri, he recruited an artillery company that became Battery 'F' of the 2nd Illinois Light Artillery, with Powell as captain. On November 28, 1861, Powell took a brief leave to marry Emma Dean. At the Battle of Shiloh, he lost his right arm below the elbow when struck by a Minié ball while in the process of giving the order to fire. The raw nerve endings in his arm caused him pain for the rest of his life.

Despite the loss of an arm, he returned to the Army and was present at the battles of Champion Hill, Big Black River Bridge, and in the siege of Vicksburg. Always the geologist, he took to studying rocks while in the trenches at Vicksburg. He was made a major and commanded an artillery brigade with the 17th Army Corps during the Atlanta campaign. After the fall of Atlanta he was transferred to George H. Thomas' army and participated in the battle of Nashville. At the end of the war he was made a brevet lieutenant colonel but preferred to use the title of "major".

After leaving the Army, Powell took the post of professor of geology at Illinois Wesleyan University. He also lectured at Illinois State Normal University for most of his career. Powell helped expand the collections of the Museum of the Illinois State Natural History Society, where he served as curator. He declined a permanent appointment in favor of exploration of the American West.

== Exploring the West ==
=== Early expeditions ===
John Wesley Powell led an expedition into the Rocky Mountains of the Colorado Territory in 1867. An expedition party of 11 men and one woman arrived in Denver on July 6 of that year. Among the men were five students (or recent graduates) from Illinois. The woman was Emma Dean Powell, wife of John Wesley Powell. Eight members of the party (including both Powells) made an ascent of Pikes Peak in the summer of 1867. After further explorations, the expedition party disbanded in September but the Powells remained in the Rockies for two additional months before returning to Illinois in December.

Powell organized and led a second expedition to the Colorado Territory in 1868. In that year, Powell, William Byers, and five other men became the first white explorers to climb Longs Peak. By December 1868, most of the expedition party had returned to Illinois but the Powells spent the winter camped on the White River, a tributary of the Green River. During that winter, Powell made excursions down both rivers, traveled south to the Grand River (now known as the Colorado River), north to the Yampa River, and around the Uinta Mountains. He also "spent days and nights in the adjacent camp of the Utes, making a vocabulary of their language at 'the request of the Smithsonian.'" Preparations were made for a now historic voyage through the Grand Canyon of the Colorado River in 1869.

=== First Colorado River expedition ===
In 1869, John Wesley Powell set out to explore the Colorado River and the Grand Canyon. Gathering ten men, four boats and food for 10 months, he set out from Green River, Wyoming, on May 24. Passing through dangerous rapids, the group passed down the Green River to its confluence with the Colorado River (then also known as the Grand River upriver from the junction), near present-day Moab, Utah, and completed the journey on August 30, 1869.

The members of the 1869 Powell expedition were:

- John Wesley Powell, trip organizer and leader, major in the Civil War
- John Colton "Jack" Sumner, hunter, trapper, soldier in the Civil War
- William H. Dunn, hunter, trapper from Colorado
- Walter H. Powell, captain in the Civil War, John's brother
- George Y. Bradley, lieutenant in the Civil War, expedition chronicler
- Oramel G. Howland, printer, editor, hunter
- Seneca Howland, soldier who was wounded in the Battle of Gettysburg
- Frank Goodman, Englishman, adventurer
- W.R. Hawkins, cook, soldier in Civil War
- Andrew Hall, Scotsman, the youngest of the expedition

The expedition's route traveled through the Utah canyons of the Colorado River, which Powell described in his published diary as having

... wonderful features—carved walls, royal arches, glens, alcove gulches, mounds and monuments. From which of these features shall we select a name? We decide to call it Glen Canyon.

Frank Goodman quit after the first month, and Dunn and the Howland brothers left at Separation Canyon in the third month. This was just two days before the group reached the mouth of the Virgin River on August 30, after traversing almost 930 mi (1,500 km). The three disappeared; some historians have speculated they were killed by the Shivwits Band of Paiutes or by Mormons in the town of Toquerville.

== The Powell Survey ==
After his 1869 navigation of the Colorado, Powell was awarded $12,000 from Congress to "[complete] the survey of the Colorado of the West and its tributaries." The Powell Survey operated alongside three other surveys of the western territories that were active at the time: the Hayden survey, the King survey, and the Wheeler survey. Powell's appropriation was renewed annually until 1879 when these four surveys were consolidated into the United States Geological Survey.

=== Second Colorado River expedition ===
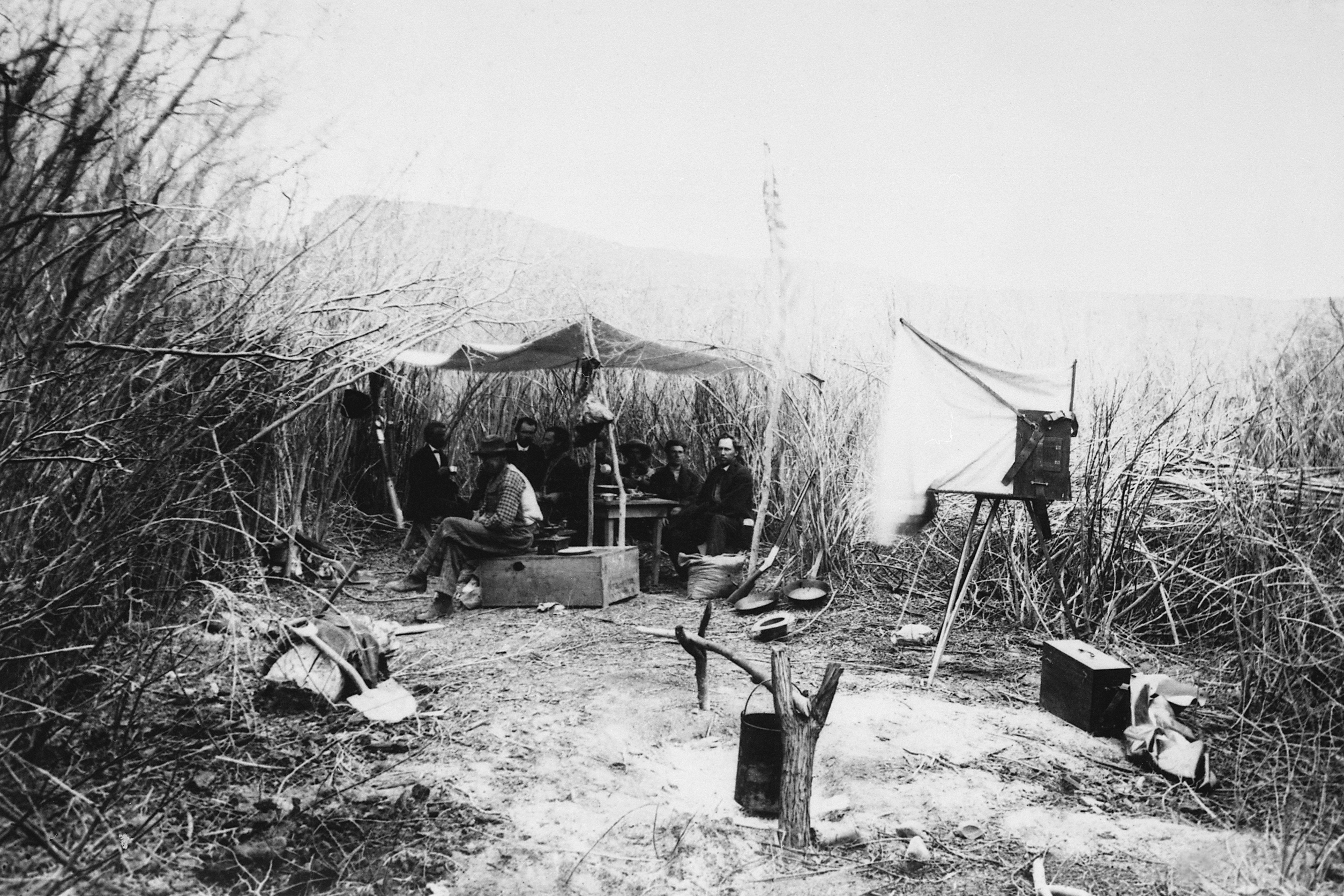
First camp of the John Wesley Powell expedition [second Colorado River expedition], in the willows, Green River, Wyoming, 1871.

In 1870, Powell scouted for locations to resupply a second river expedition. He employed the services of Jacob Hamblin, a Mormon missionary in southern Utah who had cultivated relationships with Native Americans. Hamblin introduced Powell to Chuarumpeak, a leader of the Kaibab band of Paiutes, who in turn led Powell and Hamblin from the headwaters of the Sevier River to a potential access point. Chuarumpeak also facilitated a meeting between Powell and the Shivwits Band of Paiutes, who had been accused of killing the Howlands and Dunn the year before.

The second expedition took place in 1871 and 1872, traveling the Colorado River from Green River, Wyoming to Kanab Creek in the Grand Canyon. Powell employed three photographers on this expedition; Elias Olcott Beaman, James Fennemore, and John K. Hillers. This trip resulted in photographs, a map, and various papers (at least one Powell scholar, Otis R. Marston, has opined that the maps produced from the survey were impressionistic rather than precise).

Powell himself accompanied the second expedition only intermittently. The boats launched on 22 May 1871, but Powell departed in early July to visit Emma Dean, who was experiencing a difficult pregnancy in Salt Lake City, Utah. He briefly rejoined them on 24 July at the mouth of the Uinta River but left again to look for a resupply point on the Dirty Devil. He joined them once more at Gunnison's Crossing on 29 August, and together they reached the Crossing of the Fathers on 6 October.

From there, Powell and Hillers traveled to Salt Lake City where, on 8 September, Emma Dean had given birth to the Powells' only child, Mary Dean Powell. The rest of the party continued downstream to the mouth of the Paria before being summoned by Powell to their winter quarters in Kanab. That winter and spring, they completed various overland explorations, and Powell attended to business in Washington. They returned to the river on 13 August 1872, running the Grand Canyon and encountering strong rapids. On 3 September, they arrived at Kanab Creek, where word reached the party that "the whole Shivwits band was in turmoil over several killings of their people near Mount Trumbull and in St. George" and were threatening revenge against the whites. Here, Powell decided to end the trip. They had traveled approximately 164 miles with 114 left to go.

=== Special Indian commissioner ===
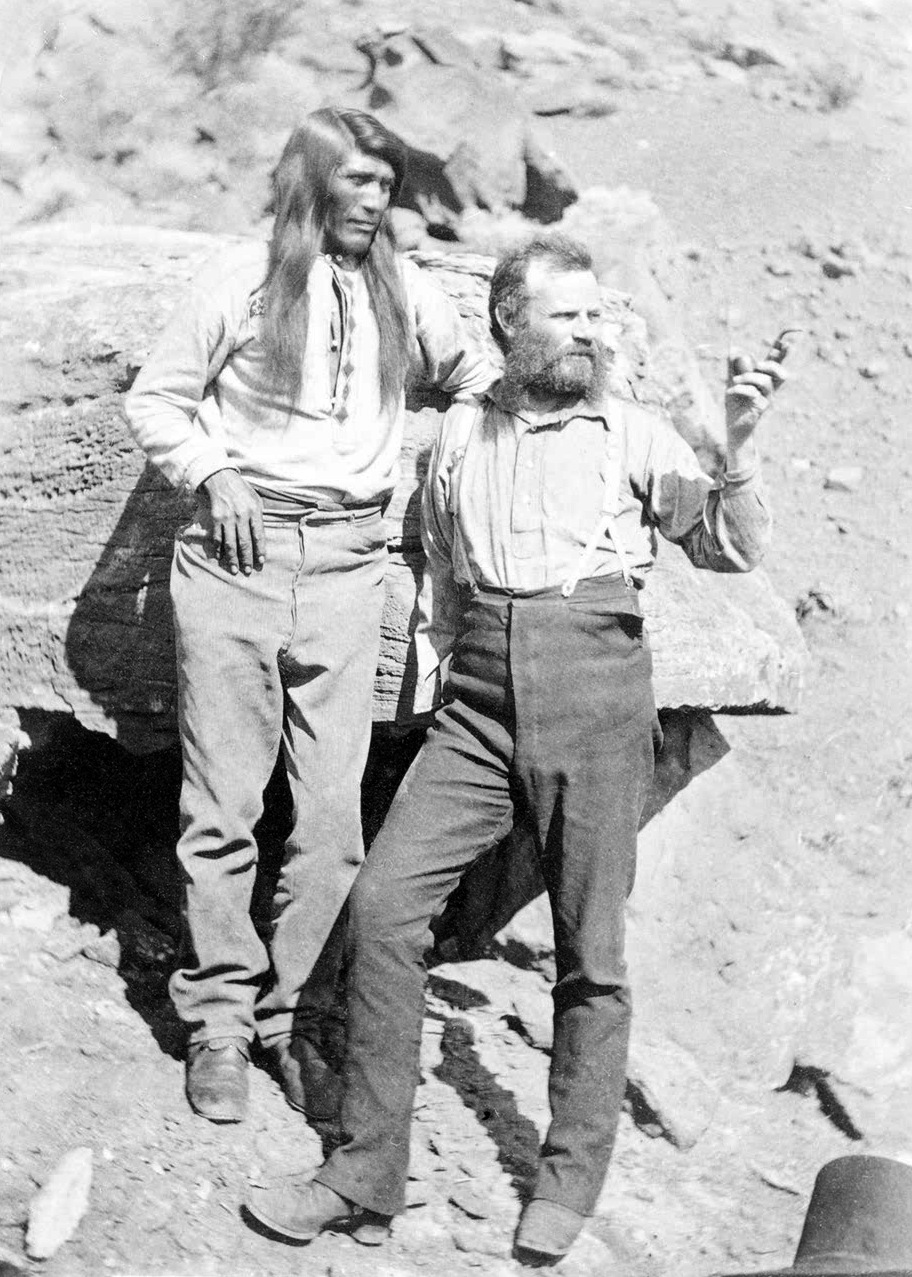
Powell (right) with Tau-gu, a Southern Paiute, 1871–1872.

In 1873, in response to tensions surrounding the Modoc War, Powell was asked to temporarily leave his surveying duties to serve as a special commissioner for the Department of the Interior. He and co-commissioner George Ingalls were tasked with

examining into the condition of the Utes of Utah; Pai-Utes of Utah, Northern Arizona, Southern Nevada, and Southeastern California; the Go-si Utes of Utah and Nevada; the Northwestern Shoshones of Idaho and Utah; and the Western Shoshones of Nevada; and for the purpose of consulting with them concerning the propriety of their removal to reservations.

In early May, Powell and Ingalls arrived in Salt Lake City and met with representatives of the Ute, Goshute, and Shoshone peoples, after which Powell returned to Washington, D.C. to offer their preliminary recommendations.

These recommendations included notifying the "Pah-vants and Seuv-a-rits" that "they shall make their homes on the Uintah reservation, and that hereafter no goods will be issued to them at any other place." The commissioners also suggested that the Southern Paiute people be invited to tour the Uintah reservation but that preparations be made for them to move to the Moapa reservation (sometimes called the "Muddy" reservation) should they prefer. They further suggested that annuities be withheld from the Western Shoshone and Goshute pending their move to reservations, and they similarly advised withholding annuities as a way to induce the Northwestern Shoshone to relocate to the Fort Hall reservation. Finally, they advocated for the hiring of Richard D. Komas, an Ute student at Lincoln University, as an interpreter.

The Office of Indian Affairs authorized Powell and Ingalls to carry out this plan of action, and Powell returned to Salt Lake City. The commissioners then traveled south to promulgate the government's orders. They first contacted the Seuvarits Utes and the Pahvant, meeting with the Pahvant leader Kanosh. Following this, they met with the Southern Paiute leader Tau-gu. Speaking for his people, Tau-gu related their unwillingness to go to the Uintah reservation. At this point, Powell and Ingalls changed tack to "make a thorough examination as to the condition of affairs in the Muddy reservation."

They traveled with a group of delegates from the Paiutes to the Moapa Indian reservation, arriving there on 10 September and staying for 14 days. While they were there, Powell worked up a monetary estimate of the claims by white settlers in the Moapa valley in the hope that the government would buy them out.

Powell and Ingalls then split up. Powell continued to confer with the Southern Paiutes before returning north for another conference with Kanosh, while Ingalls headed into northern Nevada to meet with several groups of Western Shoshone.

The commissioners rejoined one another in Corinne, Utah where they met with two groups of Northwestern Shoshone who did not want to go to the Fort Hall reservation. Shortly thereafter, they returned to Washington.

In their final report to Congress, delivered on 18 December 1873, Powell and Ingalls claim to have met with 5,522 Indian people. The report notes that the Grant administration had previously estimated that there were 27,000 Native Americans living in the entire region that Powell and Ingalls attempted to canvas but that the actual number was closer to 9,659.

The report also expanded on the commissioners' initial set of recommendations:

- It recommended that the government remove the white settlers from the Moapa valley and extend the boundaries of the Moapa Indian reservation. "Altogether the circumstances are very favorable to the project of making farmers of the Pai Utes, and thus enabling them to become self-sustaining, and converting them from vicious, dangerous savages to civilized people," the commissioners wrote.
- It further detailed measures that the government should take to enable residents of the Uintah reservation to begin farming, and it asserted that all of the Northwestern Shoshone met with by the commissioners had, in the end, agreed to go to the Fort Hall reservation.
- Regarding the Western Shoshone, only some of whom had signed a treaty with the U.S. government, Powell and Ingalls suggested that "[a] little more time and more thorough explanation is needed to induce the southern tribes to consent to a removal."
- Powell and Ingalls also claimed that the "Pa-vi-o-tsos or Pah-Utes of western Nevada" were already practicing agriculture but that they lacked sufficient land on their two existing reservations (Walker River and Pyramid Lake) and that their land base was likely to be further reduced by concessions to the Central Pacific Railroad. The commissioners therefore recommended their removal to the Malheur Reservation.

It concludes with several pages reflecting on the general situation of the Indians west of the Rocky Mountains.

Powell and Ingalls testified before Congress the following January. Powell's biographer Donald Worster notes that despite their efforts, "[n]either the whites nor the Indians followed the commission's recommendations in the next few years."

=== Work for popular consumption ===
Under the advice of James Garfield, then chairman of the House Appropriations Committee, Powell published a book based on his explorations of the Colorado in 1875 titled Report of the Exploration of the Colorado River of the West and Its Tributaries, Explored in 1869, 1870, 1871, and 1872. Some members of the second river expedition, including Fred Dellenbaugh and Almon Thompson, felt that their names had been unfairly omitted from the account.

The book was revised and republished by Flood & Vincent in 1895 as Canyons of the Colorado.

In the early 1900s the journals of the 71-72 expedition crew began to be published starting with Dellenbaugh's A Canyon Voyage in 1908, followed in 1939 by the diary of Almon Harris Thompson, who was married to Powell's sister, Ellen Powell Thompson. Bishop, Steward, W.C. Powell, and Jones's diaries were all published in 1947. These diaries made it clear Powell's writings contained some exaggerations and recounted activities that occurred on the second river trip as if they occurred on the first. They also revealed that Powell, who had only one arm, wore a life jacket, though the other men did not have them.

=== Report on the Lands of the Arid Region ===
Powell's expeditions led to his belief that the arid West was not suitable for agricultural development, except for about 2% of the lands that were near water sources. His 1878 Report on the Lands of the Arid Regions of the United States proposed reforming the system by which the government distributed land to settlers by taking into account topography and access to water in determining the shape and size of parcels. "Irrigable lands" would be organized into self-regulating irrigation districts to prevent the monopolization of water by those lucky enough to acquire riparian parcels. For the remaining lands, he proposed conservation and low-density, open grazing.

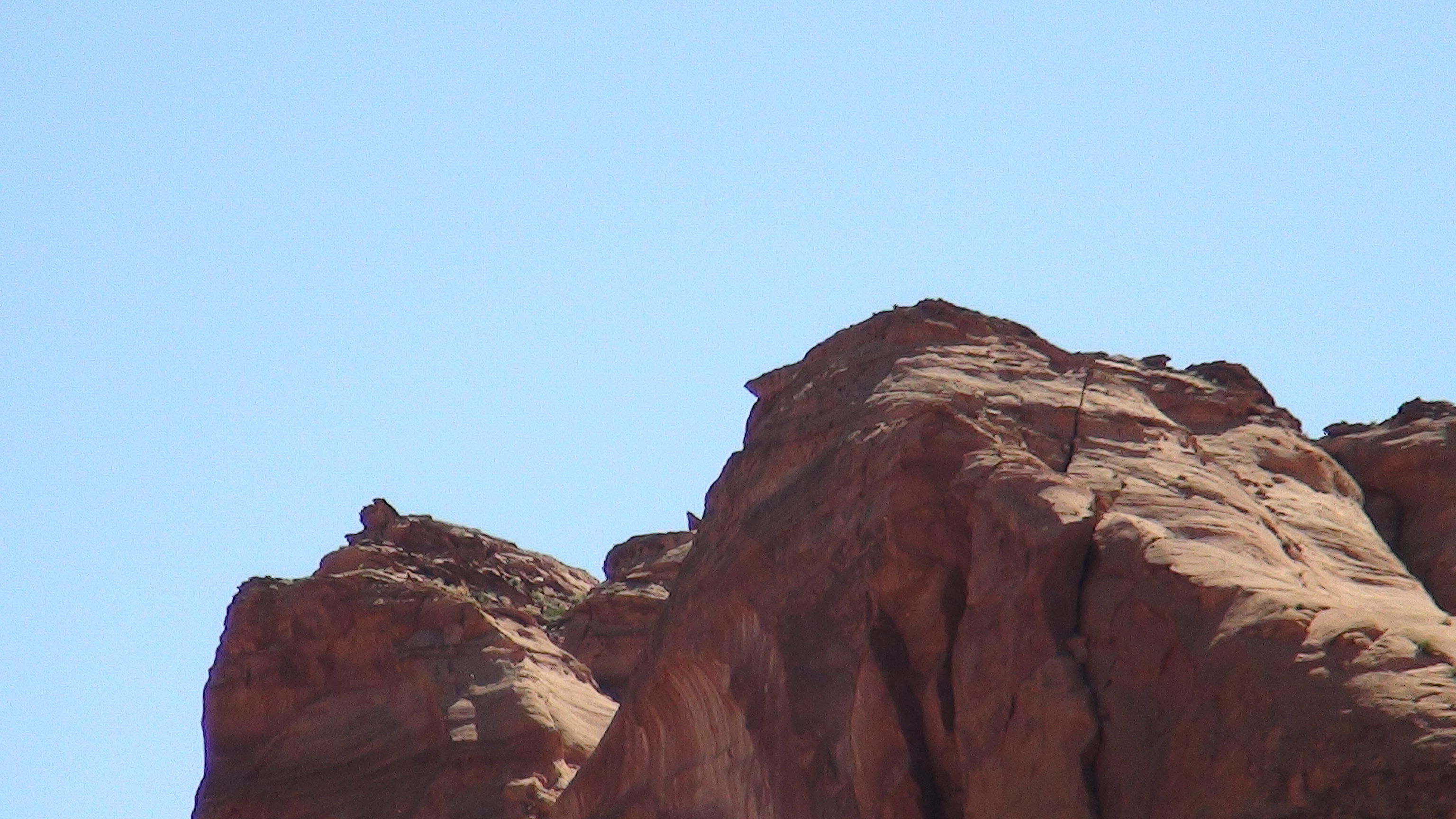
Powell's Profile, a rock formation named for John Wesley Powell in Knowles Canyon, Glen Canyon National Recreation Area, Utah.

=== Consolidation of the Western surveys and service on the Public Lands Commission ===
In the spring of 1877, Congress asked the National Academy of Sciences to offer an opinion about the duplication of responsibilities among the Western surveys. The Academy solicited Powell's advice in October 1878, and Powell vociferously argued that a more centralized approach was desirable. The Academy's final report, which was approved the following month, echoed Powell's calls to consolidate publicly-funded geological and geographic research within a single agency and to reform the homestead system. Powell also nominated his friend, Clarence King, to head the new agency.

On 3 March 1879, Congress approved the creation of the United States Geological Survey for the purpose of "the classification of the public lands and examination of the geological structure, mineral resources, and products of the national domain." In the same bill, it established a Public Lands Commission that would be tasked with recommending changes to the Homestead Act and other laws governing the dispensation of public lands. Powell was appointed to said commission in June. The group began its work on 18 August in Denver, but, "[a]ccording to the Salt Lake Tribune, [Powell] had gotten lost" and was unable to join them until September. The Commission's final report included few of the suggestions that Powell had made in his 1878 Report on the Arid Lands, and what recommendations it did include were shelved indefinitely by Congress.

The termination of the Public Lands Commission and the consolidation of the Western surveys left Powell free to pursue other projects that had captured his interest by that time: a systematic study of Native American languages and an ethnography of the Hopi.

== The Washington years ==
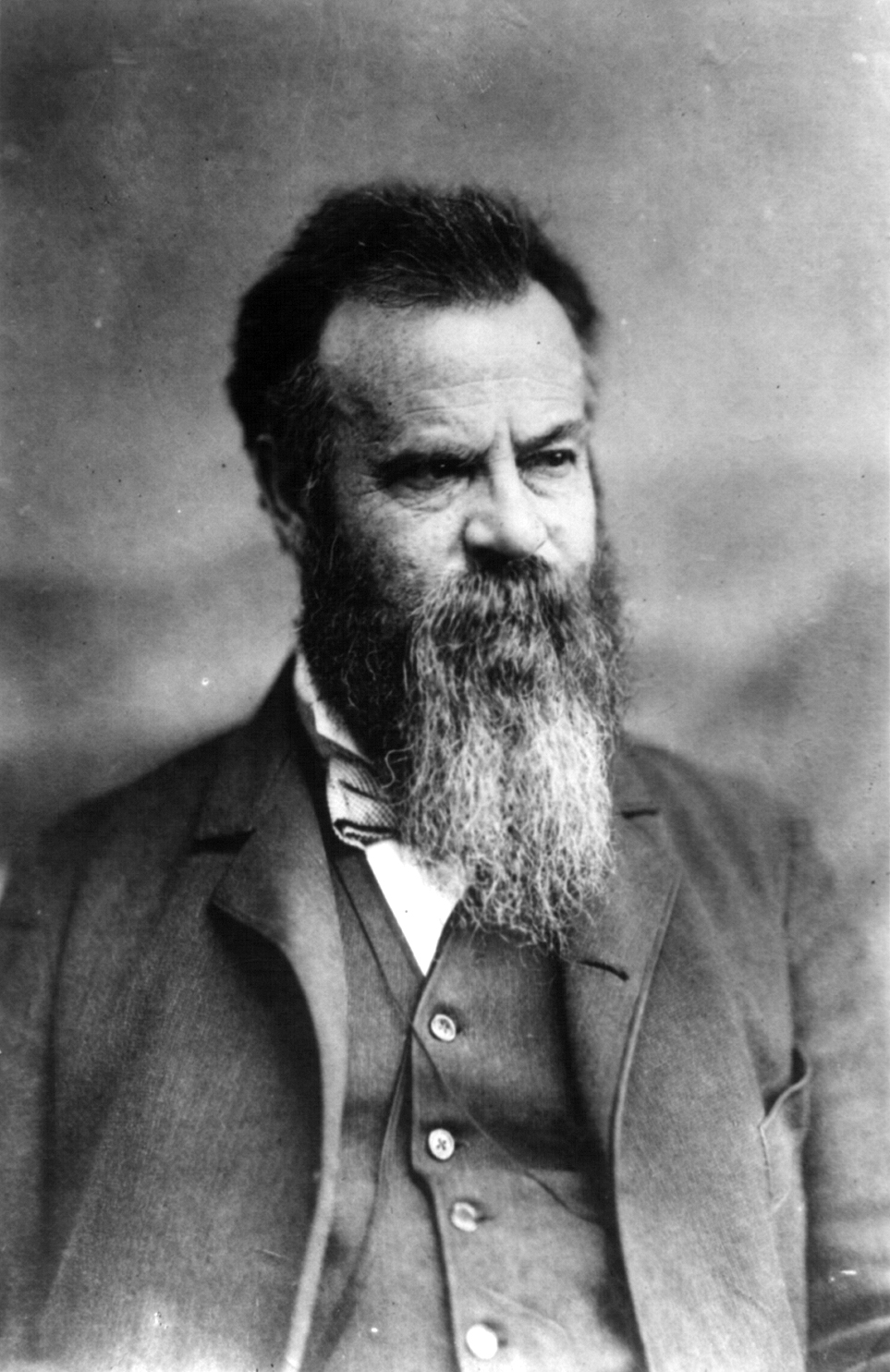
Powell served as the second director of the United States Geological Survey, a post he held from 1881 to 1894. This photograph dates from late in his term of office.

The Powells had purchased a home in Washington, D.C., in 1872, but it was not until after the consolidation of the Western surveys in 1879 that John Wesley Powell began to spend most of his time in the capital. Initially, he set out to organize and publish the information about Native Americans that he and his collaborators had collected over the previous decade. This task snowballed into the creation of the Bureau of Ethnology, and in 1881 Powell was also appointed as the second director of the U.S. Geological Survey. These offices took him out of the field and immersed him in political and administrative tasks. He continued to make occasional excursions to the Southwest, often in the company of Hayden survey alumni James Stevenson, but these trips ended after Stevenson's death in 1888.

=== Garfield's legacy ===
The same piece of legislation that funded the Geological Survey granted Powell $20,000 to organize and publish the "large amount of material relating to the Indians of North America, consisting of vocabularies, grammars, notes and materials on their habits, customs, governmental organization, mythology and religion, arts and industries, etc." that had been collected by the Powell Survey during the 1870s. The study of Native American languages and cultures was not within the purview of the new combined survey, nor any other existing government agency, yet the management of Indian reservations and the honoring of treaties with Native Americans remained duties, requiring some knowledge of Native Americans themselves, that the government was nominally obligated to fulfill. Hence, Powell was able to renew and grow this appropriation, informally establishing what would become the Bureau of Ethnology as a department of the Smithsonian.

The election of James A. Garfield as president in 1880 was taken as an auspicious sign for these research efforts by the American anthropologist Lewis H. Morgan who (in an unpublished letter cited by Donald Worster) wrote to Powell in November of that year: "Hurra for Garfield and the Ethnological bureau." As a member of Congress, Garfield had been an early supporter of Powell, urging him to publish a narrative account of the 1869 voyage to increase popular support for his work, and speaking up in defense of that work when pressure mounted to cut "wasteful" government spending. When Clarence King resigned as first director of the Geological Survey after Garfield's inauguration, Garfield appointed Powell as his replacement almost immediately.

The shooting of Garfield by Charles J. Guiteau fewer than four months later dampened the optimism surrounding both offices. As the president lay comatose, Powell met with Naval Observatory professor Simon Newcomb to discuss ongoing efforts to air-condition Garfield's room. Despite these efforts, Garfield passed away on 19 September and was succeeded by his vice-president, Chester A. Arthur.

=== Bureau of Ethnology ===
As director of the Bureau of Ethnology, Powell gave up fieldwork to coordinate the research efforts of others. His Introduction to the Study of Indian Languages offered a methodology for one of the bureau's primary tasks: cataloguing the languages spoken by Native Americans and mapping out the relationships among them. Yet the bureau's efforts were not narrowly focused. Powell hired investigators he deemed competent and allowed them to carry out their work as they saw fit.

Because anthropology as an academic discipline barely existed in the United States at that time, these investigators came from diverse backgrounds. From his own survey, Powell hired John Hillers and James Pilling. Other regular collaborators included Frank Hamilton Cushing, James Owen Dorsey, Jesse Walter Fewkes, Alice Cunningham Fletcher, Albert Gatschet, Henry Henshaw, F.W. Hodge, William Henry Holmes, Garrick Mallery, Cosmos and Victor Mindeleff, James Mooney, Erminnie A. Smith, James Stevenson, Matilda Coxe Stevenson, and Cyrus Thomas.

In his capacity as director, Powell himself was supervised by secretary of the Smithsonian Spencer Fullerton Baird and Baird's successor, Samuel Langley.

Powell's tenure at the bureau included several notable episodes in the history of American anthropology. Under Baird's direction, Powell assigned Cyrus Thomas (assisted by Edward Palmer) to determine the identity of the Mound Builders. Some doubted that the large burial mounds scattered across eastern North America could have been constructed by Native Americans, but Thomas argued persuasively that they were. The bureau also dispatched James Mooney to investigate the Ghost Dance movement during the early 1890s. According to Donald Worster, Mooney's comparison of Indians participating in the Ghost Dance to Christian revivalists "scandalized" the Methodist Church and Secretary Langley, and it was rebuked by Powell.

In 1899, the bureau's eighteenth annual report included a history of land cessions by Charles Royce. Worster finds this to be the only instance in which Powell allowed the bureau to address the topic of the Indians' territorial dispossession.

=== Second director of the USGS ===
The legislation that created the Geological Survey did not define its responsibilities in detail, and its first director Clarence King chose to allocate most of the organization's resources to economic geology. Powell maintained King's appointments, but he also grew the agency and broadened the scope of its research, allowing its employees more freedom to pursue basic science. Or, as a 1989 USGS circular put it,

King had given the work of the Geological Survey a mission orientation, planned the goals, and selected the staff, but given them freedom to choose their methods of work in order to achieve the goals. Powell allowed the staff to choose not only their methods of work but the subjects they would investigate as well.

Powell's longtime colleagues, Gilbert and Dutton, hired by King to coordinate research on the Great Basin and the Plateau Province respectively, were allowed to continue their inquiries into geologic history; and, Powell increased funding for a paleontology division headed by Othniel C. Marsh (who had also been hired by King) that produced a report on the Dinocerata. However, Powell's most significant act as director of the Survey was arguably to initiate the creation of a national topographic map. During his second year in office, his budget request included an amendment that would allow the agency "to continue the preparation of a geological map of the United States." This "geological map" would in fact be a topographic map, as he later explained:

Without a good topographic map geology cannot even be thoroughly studied, and the publication of the results of geologic investigation is very imperfect without a good map; but with a good map thorough investigation and simple, intelligible publication becomes possible.

Powell placed Henry Gannett in charge of the mapping division which quickly grew to become "the largest part of the Geological Survey program."

=== "A war upon science" ===
By 1884, the Geological Survey and other government agencies tasked with conducting scientific research had grown considerably. A joint committee chaired by William Boyd Allison was convened to audit expenditures and eliminate redundancies. Powell testified before the committee (known as the "Allison Commission") in December of 1884, explaining technical aspects of the Survey's work and arguing for the utility of publicly-funded research:

It would be a grave mistake should the Government organizations seek to absorb or in any way control the whole body of scientific research in the country, or to do any scientific work that could and would probably be done by other organizations or by private enterprise. But there are certain classes of scientific work that can only be prosecuted by great Governments, and that are so intimately related to the industries of the country that there is an absolute demand for the same.

He went on to make the case that scientific research "cannot be controlled by some central authority" and that scientists ought to be left to regulate their own affairs:

Whenever the scientific works of the General Government fall out of the control of scientific men, and into the hands of officers or functionaries whose interest is not in all research, but only in official position and dignity, such a political institution for the advancement of science at once becomes severed from the great body of scientific men; it no longer takes a proper part in the great work to be done, and it speedily decays in influence and value.

Early in 1885, "[r]umors began to circulate . . . that the USGS director was falling into disgrace and indeed was finished." Articles appeared in the popular press disparaging the Survey's work, including complaints that one had to believe in evolution to get a job there. The member of the Allison Commission most skeptical of Powell's arguments was Hilary Herbert, a Democrat from Alabama. Herbert corresponded with the Harvard scientist Alexander Agassiz whose friend, Julius Erasmus Hilgard of the United States Coast and Geodetic Survey, was also being subjected to questioning. In letters submitted during the Commission's second round of meetings, Herbert wrote to Agassiz: "I beg to inquire whether in your opinion the work of the Geological Bureau could profitablv be brought within proper bounds. . . . Please tell me also whether you deem it imperative that the Government geologist should do topography?" Agassiz replied,

It is an impossible thing to make a good geological map of the country without having as a groundwork a good topographical map of the country. If the States are not willing to go to that expense, it seems plain that they do not wish the Government to go to that expense for them.

Agassiz also criticized the mining studies and paleontology that had been carried out by the Geological Survey and defended the work of the Coast Survey.

Charles Sanders Peirce, who also worked at the Coast Survey, found Agassiz's comments to be "abominable" and called them "the first brush of a war upon science." Despite Pierce's concerns, the Allison Commission vindicated Powell, reporting in June of 1886 that the Geological Survey was "well conducted" and stating that they had "no doubt of the wisdom of a geological survey of the whole country" or "the propriety of its being done by the General Government as settled by existing legislation."

=== The Irrigation Survey ===
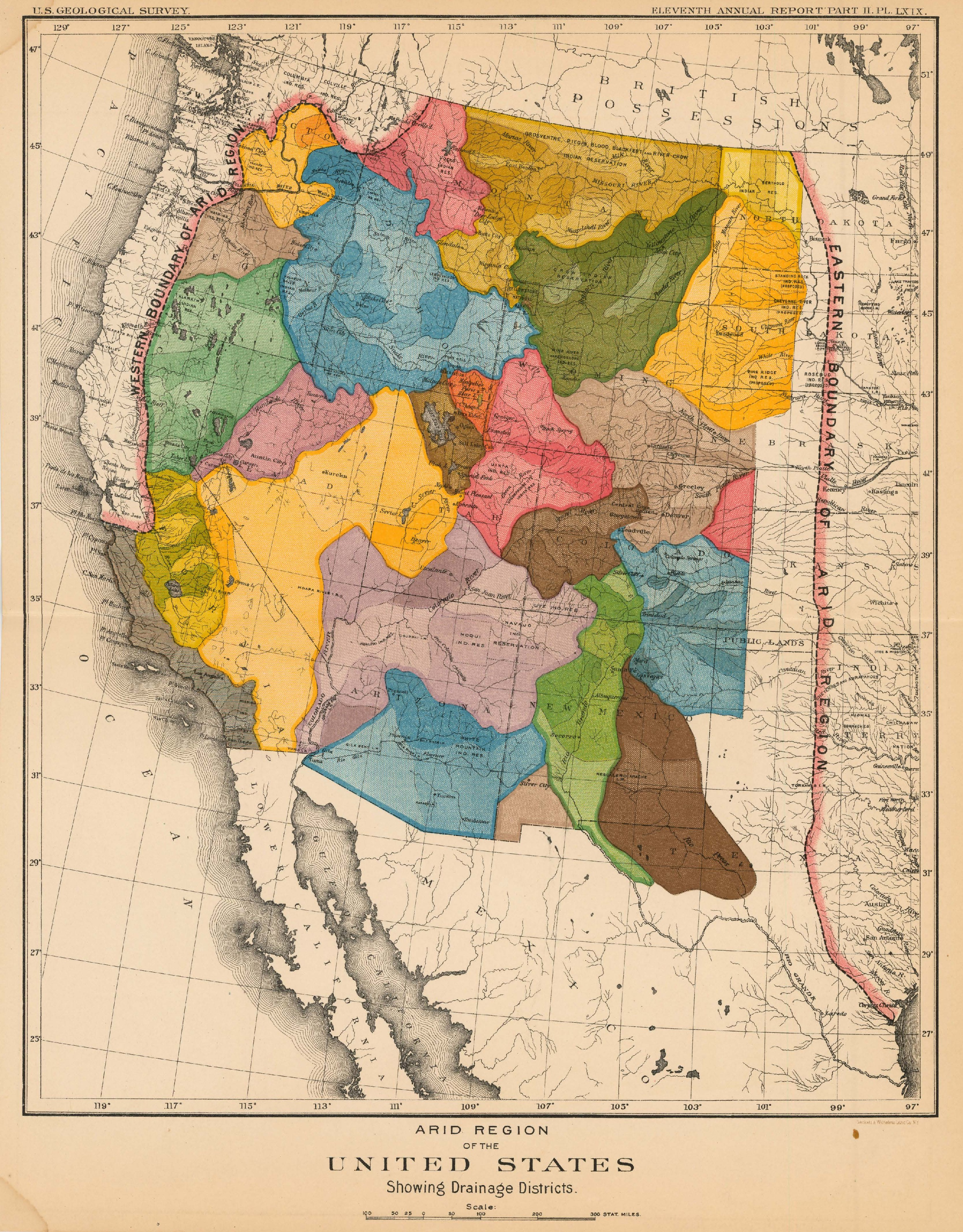
Map of watersheds of the western arid region of the United States. Created by John Wesley Powell for the Eleventh Annual Report of the Director of the United States Geological Survey, Part 2 - Irrigation: 1889–1890.

As director of the USGS, Powell continued to argue for the orderly development of arid western lands. In 1885, 1886, and 1889, harsh blizzards killed livestock, and a multi-year drought devastated farmers. In response, Congress appropriated funds in 1888 for the USGS to undertake a survey of irrigable lands and identify possible areas for dams and irrigation projects. With the same legislation, Congress directed the Secretary of the Interior to withdraw irrigable lands from the public domain, stating,

all the lands made susceptible of irrigation by such reservoirs, ditches or canals are from this time henceforth hereby reserved from sale as the property of the United States, and shall not be subject after the passage of this act, to entry, settlement or occupation until further provided by law . . ."

The Irrigation Survey identified possible sites for reservoirs in Utah, Texas, and California through the summer of 1889. However, the survey's purpose was undermined by speculators that followed the expedition and subsequently claimed land that it identified as irrigable, knowing that the land would be made more valuable by the planned irrigation projects. After the surveying and consequent speculation on the land around Bear Lake in Idaho and Utah, the Secretary of the Interior responded by withdrawing all lands from the public domain west of the 101st meridian until the survey could be concluded. This action provoked a backlash from Congress, speculators, and would-be settlers.

Western legislators, led by Senator William M. Stewart of Nevada, had originally championed the creation of the Irrigation Survey. However, Stewart soon turned against Powell. Stewart imagined the survey identifying potential sites for irrigation and then turning them over to private interests to develop. Powell, on the other hand, argued for the creation of irrigation districts based on watersheds in which the water would be owned and distributed by local communities. With the Secretary of the Interior's controversial withdrawal of all land from the public domain, Powell lost even more favor from the American public and gained further ire from vested commercial interests, making his plans for the scientifically managed development of the West politically impossible.

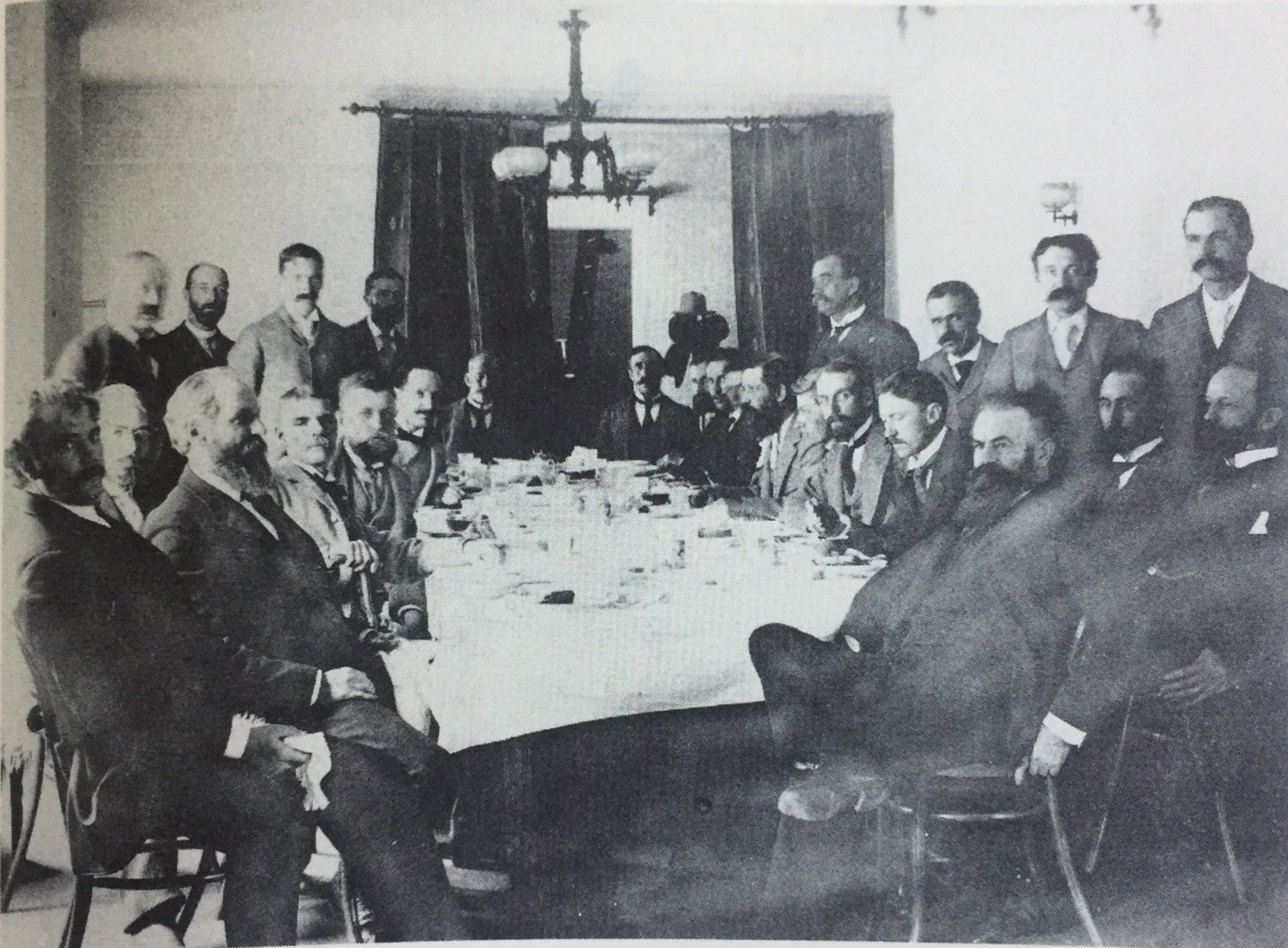
John Wesley Powell at a farewell dinner from the United States Geological Survey, after resigning as the 2nd director of the institution in 1894.

In 1890, the legislation that mandated closure of the public domain was repealed, and funds for the Irrigation Survey were slashed. The following year, the overall budget of the Geological Survey was cut as well. With the financial troubles caused by the Panic of 1893, the Survey's near-term chances of budgetary recovery were dashed. In 1894, suffering from declining health, Powell resigned as Director of the Geological Survey to focus on his anthropological work at the Bureau of American Ethnology.

In October 1893, at the second International Irrigation Conference in Los Angeles, Powell would prophetically remark: "[g]entlemen, you are piling up a heritage of conflict and litigation over water rights, for there is not sufficient water to supply these lands." However, Powell's ideas went generally disregarded with the Homestead Act, large-scale damming projects by the United States Bureau of Reclamation, and water rights untethered to the land being norms throughout the West in the years following. Powell's recommendations for development of the West were largely ignored until after the Dust Bowl of the 1920s and 1930s, resulting in untold suffering associated with pioneer subsistence farms that failed because of insufficient rain and irrigation water.

=== Late anthropology and philosophy ===
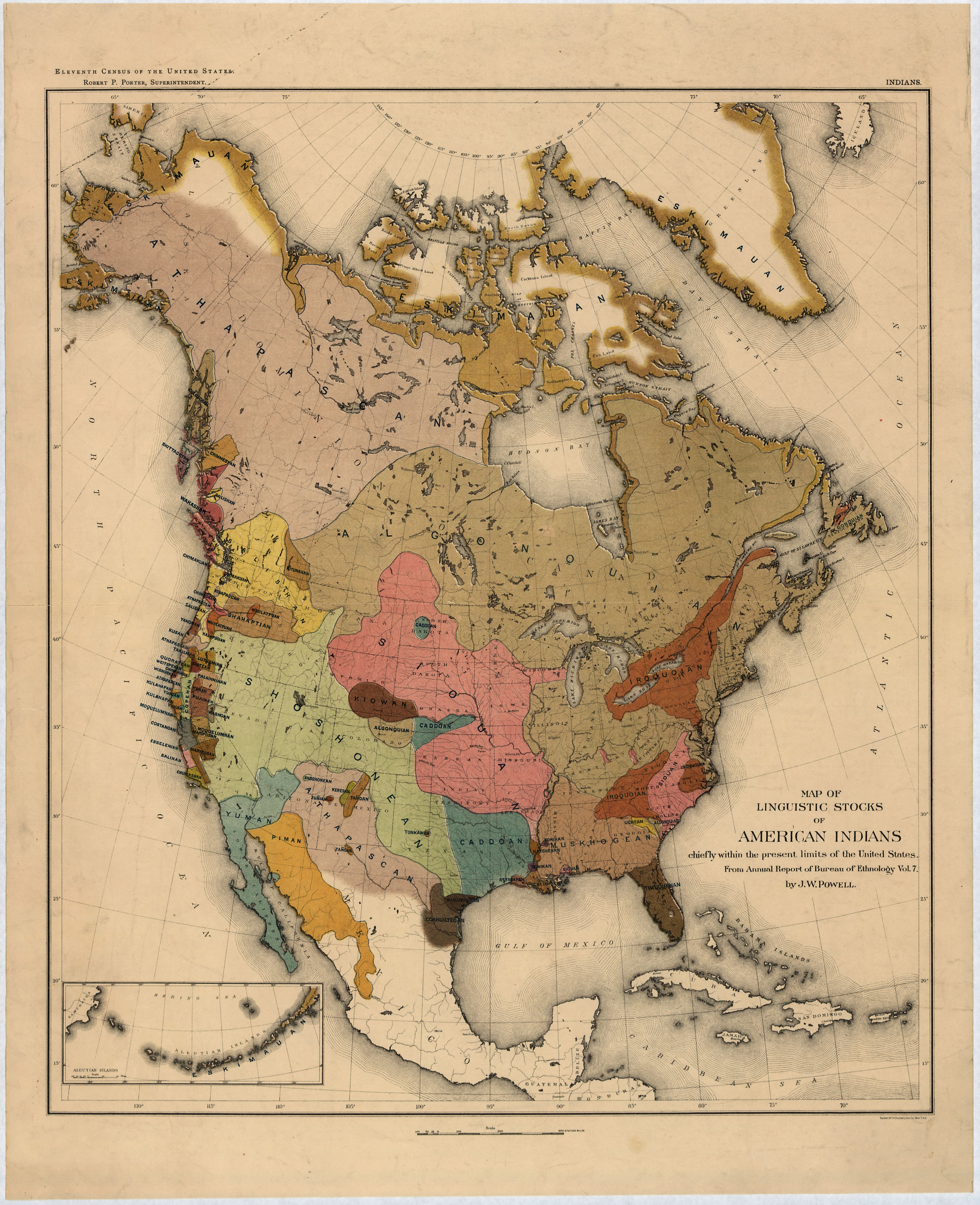
Synthesis of the BAE's linguistic research, displayed at the 1893 World's Columbian Exposition in Chicago.

Powell carried on his directorship of the Bureau of Ethnology through the 1880s and into the 1890s, although an operation in 1894 to relieve the pain where his arm had been amputated left him debilitated, after which he delegated many of his responsibilities to William John McGee. In 1891, a culmination of the Bureau's linguistic research appeared: Indian Linguistic Families of America North of Mexico. The Bureau's findings were illustrated on a map that was displayed during the 1893 World's Columbian Exposition.

Increasingly, Powell was drawn to abstract speculations about human nature and the processes of social change. In essays such as "From Savagery to Barbarism" and "From Barbarism to Civilization," he attempts to buttress and extend Lewis Henry Morgan's theory of social evolution. And, in his final address as president of the Anthropological Society of Washington, he turns his anthropological eye on "civilization" itself, criticizing the idea Social Darwinism and arguing that humans achieve progress through cooperation:

The struggle for existence between human individuals is murder, and the best are not selected thereby. The struggle for existence between bodies of men is warfare, and the best are not selected thereby. The law of natural selection, which Darwin and a host of others have so clearly pointed out at the means by which the progress of animals and plants has been secured, cannot be relied upon to secure the progress of mankind.

Powell proposes that, for humans, the principle of "survival of the fittest" has come to be applied to "arts, institutions, [language], and opinions" in a struggle not for existence but for "happiness." In the domain of economic competition, he makes a distinction between "emulative" and "antagonistic" competition, praising the former and deploring the latter. He concludes by inveighing against the evil of advertising and mocking the "philosophers" who justify human suffering as an economic necessity.

After resigning from the Geological Survey, Powell embarked upon writing Truth and Error, or the Science of Intellection, a work that "would occupy [him] for several years, pulling him farther and farther from the quotidian life." This work was intended to show "the mental processes needed to discriminate what was real from what was not," but Donald Worster finds its philosophical ideas to be "more reminiscent of the nineteenth century than anticipatory of the twentieth."

== Final years ==
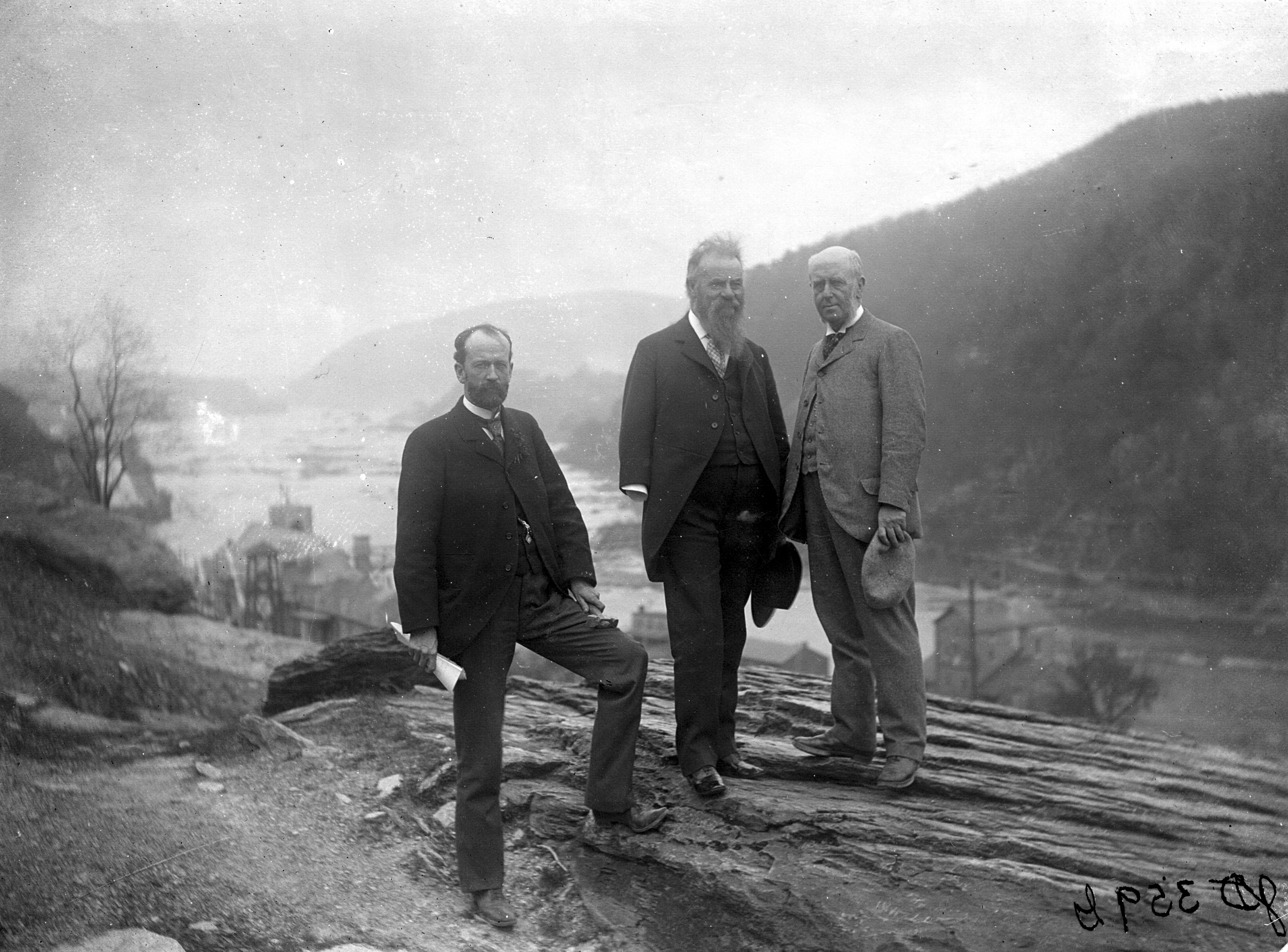
Charles Doolittle Walcott, John Wesley Powell, and Sir Archibald Geikie on a geological field excursion to Harpers Ferry, West Virginia, May 1897.

Powell spent the summer of 1895 in Gloucester, MA, where he worked on his book with the aid of stenographer May Clark. Clark had joined the Geological Survey in 1889, and she assisted Powell throughout his final years. The following summer, the Powells began making regular visits to a resort community known as the Haven in Brooklin, Maine, where they purchased a residence in 1899.

By January 1902, Powell had begun to correspond with Fred Dellenbaugh about a book the latter was writing on the second Colorado River expedition; however, he suffered a stroke toward the end of that month and was unable to contribute a planned introduction. John Wesley Powell died in his bed on 23 September. He was survived by Emma Dean, who passed away on March 13, 1924, in Washington, D.C. and was buried alongside her husband in Arlington National Cemetery.

== Powell and Native Americans ==
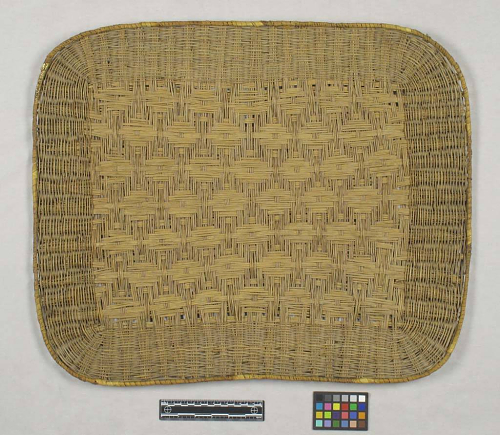
Hopi basketry bread tray, donated to the U.S. National Museum of Natural History by J.W. Powell in 1876.

=== Personal views ===
Powell was a friend and follower of Lewis Henry Morgan whose 1877 book Ancient Society argued that all human societies progressed from "savagery" to "barbarism" and finally "civilization." These classifications were based on factors such as technology, family and social organization, property relations, and religion. Powell, like Morgan, believed that the course of human development was linear and universal. For example, in The Exploration of the Canyons of the Colorado, he describes the subsistence practices of a group of Indians "more nearly in their primitive condition than any others on the continent with whom I am acquainted." And, As Frederick E. Hoxie notes, Powell criticized ethnologist James Mooney for comparing the indigenous Ghost Dance movement to Christian revivalism because "the gap between civilized and uncivilized peoples was 'so broad and deep that few representatives of either race [were] ever able to clearly see its further side.'" Powell's insistence on what Hoxie calls "conceptual purity" contrasts with Wallace Stegner's observation that by 1869 many Native American tribes had been pushed to extinction, and many of those who survived had experienced significant intercultural exchange.

As many scholars have noted, Morgan's hierarchical schema was often used to justify the dispossession of Native peoples and to support theories of racial difference. Indeed, the study of ethnology was often a way for scientists to demarcate social categories in order to justify government-sponsored programs that exploited newly appropriated land and its inhabitants. Believing that "progress" was linear and inevitable, Powell advocated for government funding to be used to 'civilize' Native American populations, pushing for the teaching of English as well as Western methods of farming and manufacture. However, Powell was not a Social Darwinist. Nor did Powell consider race a more important factor than culture for explaining differences between human groups.

Powell is credited with coining the word "acculturation", first using it in an 1880 report by the U.S. Bureau of American Ethnography. In 1883, Powell defined "acculturation" as psychological changes induced by cross-cultural imitation.

=== Influence on policy ===
Powell's anthropological research often coincided with political advocacy as he sought to advise federal agencies, Native peoples, and politicians about how best to manage the influx of white settlers to the West. In general, Powell thought that the colonization of North America by white settlers was inevitable but that government action could hasten the adoption of settler culture by Natives.

Accordingly, Powell's advice often reflected the differences, as he understood them, among Native peoples. For example, the 1873 report that he co-authored with George Ingalls recommended consolidating the reservations west of the Rocky Mountains based on language groups and cultural affinities. The scheme that Powell and Ingalls proposed (which was never fully implemented) would have used persuasion and the withholding of annuities to relocate members of the Ute language group to the Uintah reservation, members of the Shoshoni language group to the Fort Hall reservation, Southern Paiutes to the Moapa reservation, and Northern Paiutes to the Malheur reservation. Powell and Ingalls hoped that by making government aid conditional on "work" (as they understood it), they could induce the members of these groups to become farmers.

Powell also criticized what he saw as missteps by the government in its dealings with Native people. In the same 1873 report and in subsequent testimony before Congress, he argued against the deployment of troops to areas inhabited by Indians. "If the troops are not absolutely necessary in the country for the purpose of overawing these Indians, or protecting them in their rights against the encroachments of white men, it will be conceded that they should be removed," he wrote. Expanding on this idea, he explained:

It seems very difficult for them [Native Americans] to understand how a body of people can be set apart from all others, and who make it their sole business to kill people and to prepare themselves for killing people, and who care nothing for social life, and do not desire to have wives and children as other men, and their presence is always a source of trouble and loathsome disease.

In his 1878 Report on the Methods of Surveying the Public Domain, Powell also criticized government efforts at assimilation for failing to recognize the structure and complexity of Native societies. "Savagery is not inchoate civilization," Powell wrote; "it is a distinct status of society, with its own institutions, customs, philosophy, and religion; and all these must necessarily be overthrown before new institutions, customs, philosophy, and religion can be introduced." He called attention to the democratic nature of tribal decision-making and Native aversion to land ownership by individuals, making the case that achieving assimilation would require sufficient funding and a long-term commitment.

However, Powell was uncompromising in his view that land-based spiritual practices and hunting as a means of subsistence must disappear. In his 1874 testimony, he notes that the Utes of western Colorado had no desire to practice sedentary agriculture and had signed treaties with the government asserting their right to land where game was still plentiful. "The sooner this country is entered by white people and the game destroyed so that the Indians will be compelled to gain a subsistence by some other means than hunting, the better it will be for them," he said.

Some of Powell's most dismissive remarks about Native society are recorded in an 1880 letter to Senator H.M. Teller of Utah in which Powell states that the removal of Indians from their ancestral lands "is the first step to be taken in their civilization." Attorney and historian Charles Wilkinson calls this letter "treacherous" and "the darkest episode" of Powell's career." Historian Frederick E. Hoxie further notes that in the same letter Powell calls for the introduction of private property and citizenship for Native people, characterizing it as "a chilling condensation of the social evolutionist blueprint."

Powell's descriptions of Native land-use practices were sometimes inaccurate and served to advance settler colonial goals. For example, in his 1878 Report on the Lands of the Arid Region, Powell attributes widespread forest fires to Native agency and concludes "[t]he fires can, then, be very greatly curtailed by the removal of the Indians." William deBuys notes that Powell's claims about the extent of the fires is "surprising" and that Powell himself later blamed such fires on white settlers.

== Legacy, honors, and namesakes ==
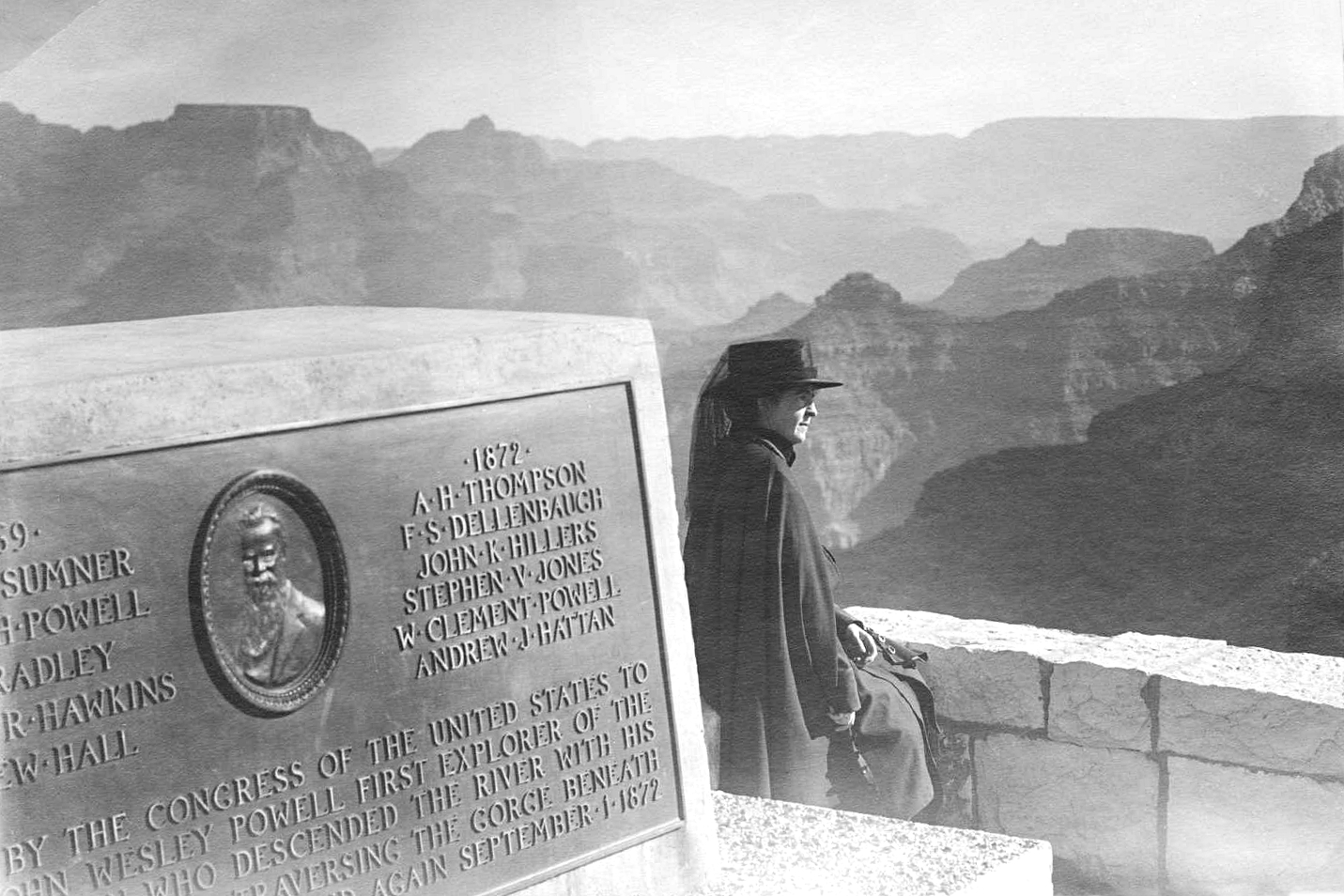
Maud Powell, niece of John Wesley Powell, photographed at his monument, Grand Canyon, Arizona, 1918

In recognition of his national service, Powell was buried in Arlington National Cemetery, Virginia. The John D. Dingell Jr. Conservation, Management, and Recreation Act, signed 12 March 2019, authorizes the establishment of the "John Wesley Powell National Conservation Area," consisting of approximately 29,868 acres of land in Utah. Green River, Wyoming, the embarkation site of both Powell expeditions, commissioned a statue depicting Powell holding an oar in front of the Sweetwater County History Museum. In Powell's honor, the USGS National Center in Reston, Virginia, was dedicated as the "John Wesley Powell Federal Building" in 1974. In addition, the highest award presented by the USGS to persons outside the federal government is named the John Wesley Powell Award. In 1984, Powell was inducted into the Hall of Great Westerners of the National Cowboy & Western Heritage Museum.

In 1889, intellectual gatherings Powell hosted in his home in Washington, D.C., were formalized as the Cosmos Club. The club has continued, with members elected to the club for their contributions to scholarship and civic activism.

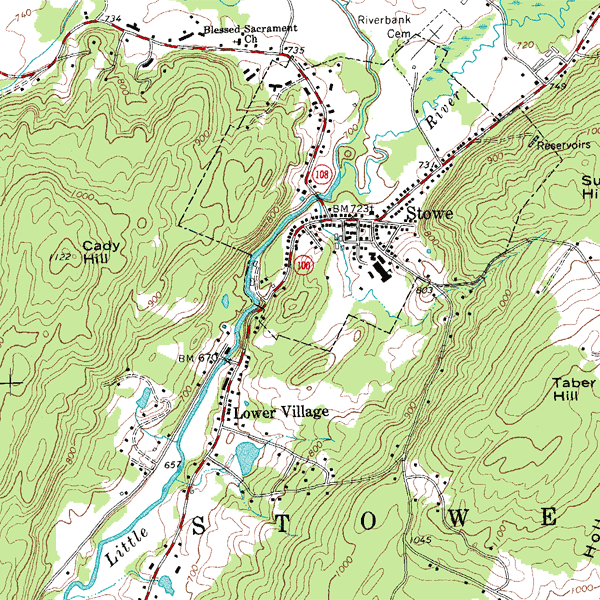
An inset from the USGS topographic map of Stowe, Vermont, U.S., featuring 20-foot (6.096 m) contour intervals. The scale is 1:24,000.

Biographer Donald Worster finds the topographic maps whose creation Powell initiated as second director of the U.S. Geological Survey to be "Powell's most significant legacy in earth science":

This was unabashedly "useful" science, but it was science that served not a small number of mining corporations, or even the interests of industrialists particularly, but the most basic environmental needs of a whole society. . . . Generations would run their fingers over brown lines of contour, blue lines of waterways, green patches of vegetation, black lines of cultural features—the cartographic conventions that Powell adopted for this, his most cherished project.

=== Awards ===
An article in Scientific American notes the following awards:

- 1880 – Elected to National Academy of Sciences
- 1886 – Honorary Ph.D. from University of Heidelberg on 500th anniversary
- 1886 – Honorary LL.D. from Harvard University on 230th anniversary
- 1879–1888 – president of Anthropological Society of Washington
- 1884 – president of Philosophical Society of Washington
- 1874 – elected member and fellow of American Association for the Advancement of Science (AAAS)
- 1875 – vice president of AAAS

Powell was also an elected member of the American Academy of Arts and Sciences and the American Philosophical Society.

=== Namesakes ===
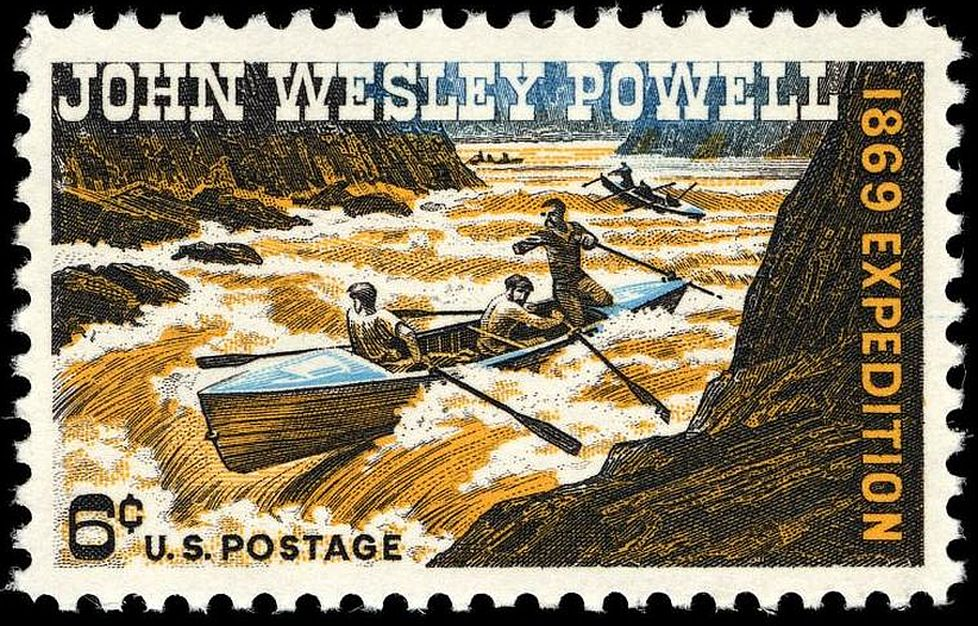
John Wesley Powell was honored on a U.S. commemorative stamp in 1969.

The following were named after Powell:

- The rare mineral powellite.
- Lake Powell, a man-made reservoir on the Colorado River.
- Mount Powell, a summit in the Sierra Nevada of California.
- Powell Peak.
- Powell Plateau, near Steamboat Mountain on the North Rim of the Grand Canyon.
- Powell, Wyoming, and the Powell Flats area.
- The residential building of the Criminal Justice Services Department of Mesa County in Grand Junction, Colorado.
- John Wesley Powell Middle School in Littleton, Colorado.
- Powell Junior High School in Mesa, Arizona.

Preceded by Clarence King	Director of the United States Geological Survey; 1881–1894	Succeeded by Charles Doolittle Walcott
