= Same-sex marriage in New Mexico =

Same-sex marriage became legally recognized statewide in New Mexico through a ruling of the New Mexico Supreme Court on December 19, 2013, requiring county clerks to issue marriage licenses to all qualified couples regardless of gender. Until then, same-sex couples could only obtain marriage licenses in certain counties of the state. Eight of the 33 counties, covering 58% of the state's population, had begun issuing marriage licenses to same-sex couples in August and September 2013. New Mexico's marriage statute was not specific as to gender, and it was the only state lacking a state statute or constitutional provision explicitly addressing same-sex marriage. Lacking a state law or judicial ruling concerning same-sex marriage prior to December 19, 2013, policy for the issuance of marriage licenses to same-sex couples was determined at the county level at the discretion of local issuing authorities i.e., some counties recognized same-sex marriage and issued marriage licenses to same-sex couples, while others did not.

A small number of same-sex marriages were licensed in Sandoval County in 2004. The practice was halted later that same day, February 20, after New Mexico Attorney General Patricia A. Madrid issued a ruling that they were invalid. On August 21, 2013, the county clerk of Doña Ana County, on his own initiative, began issuing marriage licenses to same-sex couples. Later in the month, three district judges ruling on separate lawsuits ordered first Santa Fe County, then Bernalillo County, and then Taos County, to issue marriage licenses to same-sex couples, with a fourth judge ordering the same in Grant County in September. A similar ruling was made in Los Alamos County, where the county clerk said she would not comply with the order until it was upheld on September 4, the first time a New Mexican judge affirmed a ruling for same-sex marriage after it had been challenged. Meanwhile, county clerks in San Miguel and Valencia counties altered marriage licenses for same-sex couples.

On August 29, 2013, New Mexico's county clerks voted unanimously to ask the New Mexico Supreme Court to rule on the legality of same-sex marriage and the Supreme Court held a hearing on their petition on October 23. On December 19, 2013, that court issued a unanimous decision in Griego v. Oliver holding that marriage licenses must be issued to couples without respect to gender, making New Mexico the sixteenth U.S. state to legalize same-sex marriage.

== Statutes ==
Unlike many states, New Mexico never passed a law banning same-sex marriage. In 1996, the U.S. Congress enacted the Defense of Marriage Act (DOMA; Spanish: Ley de Defensa del Matrimonio) which banned federal recognition of same-sex marriages. New Mexico never enacted a similar law at the state level. State statutes define marriage as follows:

Marriage is contemplated by the law as a civil contract, for which the consent of the contracting parties, capable in law of contracting, is essential. [N.M. Stat. § 40-1-1]

Additionally, state statutes read the following in relation to the legal status of marriages from other jurisdictions:

All marriages celebrated beyond the limits of this state, which are valid according to the laws of the country wherein they were celebrated or contracted, shall be likewise valid in this state, and shall have the same force as if they had been celebrated in accordance with the laws in force in this state. [N.M. Stat. § 40-1-4]

In July 2007, a Massachusetts court determined that New Mexico did not have a statute banning same-sex marriage and therefore same-sex couples that were resident in New Mexico could marry in Massachusetts. State Representative Al Park raised the issue a few years later, posing a formal inquiry to the New Mexico Attorney General, Gary K. King, who offered his view on January 4, 2011, that "a same-sex marriage that is valid under the laws of the country or state where it was consummated would likely be valid in New Mexico." A spokesman for Governor Susana Martinez responded by noting noted "that no New Mexico court has ruled on this issue". The advocacy group Freedom to Marry complained that New Mexico had yet to respond to the Massachusetts ruling even though, in its view, "New Mexico's laws do not prohibit marriage between same-sex couples".

The plaintiffs in Griego v. Oliver argued when they initiated their lawsuit in March 2013 that the failure of New Mexico's statutes to specify the gender of the parties to a marriage contract and their gender-neutral language allowed state officials to interpret them to allow them to issue marriage licenses to same-sex couples. When the New Mexico Supreme Court issued its decision in that case on December 19, 2013, the court unanimously held:

We hold that the State of New Mexico is constitutionally required to allow same-gender couples to marry and must extend to them the rights, protections, and responsibilities that derive from civil marriage under New Mexico law.

== Legislative efforts ==
Legislation that would allow or prohibit same-sex marriage, or that would provide for domestic partnerships, was introduced several times in the late 2000s and early 2010s. In January 2008, a domestic partnership bill, House Bill 9, advocated by Governor Bill Richardson as part of his legislative agenda, passed the New Mexico House of Representatives by a 33 to 31 vote and was sent to the Senate, which took no action on it. A similar bill had been defeated in the 2007 legislative session. House Bill 47, providing that marriage may only be between "a man and a woman", and House Joint Resolution 3, proposing a constitutional amendment to define marriage as being between "a man and a woman", both died when the New Mexico Legislature adjourned sine die on February 14, 2008, without acting on them.

On February 27, 2009, domestic partnership legislation that would have granted both same-sex and opposite-sex couples many of the same rights of marriage was voted down in the Senate by a 17–25 margin, with 10 Democrats and 15 Republicans opposing the legislation. Supported by Governor Bill Richardson, supporters vowed to take up the issue again sometime later in 2009. On February 15, 2010, a domestic partnership bill sponsored by Senator Peter Wirth was defeated in a Senate committee, "[striking] a blow to Richardson, who made extending many of the same rights enjoyed by married couples to gays and lesbians part of his legislative agenda." A proposed constitutional amendment sponsored by Senator William Sharer that would have limited marriage to opposite-sex couples was defeated by another Senate committee.

On January 22, 2013, Representative Brian Egolf introduced a resolution (House Joint Resolution 3), which would have put a constitutional amendment allowing same-sex marriage to a popular vote in November 2014. He said, "This will be the law sooner than people think." The measure's co-sponsors included another Santa Fe Democrat, Representative Stephen Easley. It required approval by both houses of the New Mexico Legislature. On January 31, the House Consumer and Public Affairs Committee approved the measure in a 3–2 vote. On February 21, the Voters and Elections Committee defeated it on a 4–7 vote. On January 22, Representative Nora Espinoza, a Republican, introduced House Joint Resolution 4, which would have put a constitutional amendment banning same-sex marriage to a popular vote in November 2014. A committee failed to approve it in a 2–3 vote on February 5. The Legislature ended its legislative session on February 20, 2014, without taking any further action on the resolution.

On March 1, 2019, the New Mexico Senate passed a bill by a vote of 39–0 replacing references to "husband and wife" in state property statutes with the gender-neutral term "spouses". The House approved the legislation 62–0 on March 16. It was signed into law by Governor Michelle Lujan Grisham and went into effect on July 1, 2019.

== Local jurisdictions ==
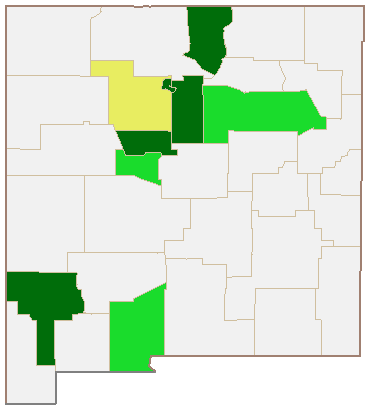
New Mexico counties on licensing same-sex marriages prior to the ruling in Griego v. Oliver by the New Mexico Supreme Court, which legalized same-sex marriages statewide: Under court order (Bernalillo, Grant, Los Alamos, Santa Fe, and Taos) On clerk's initiative (Doña Ana, San Miguel, and Valencia) Formerly issued licenses (Sandoval) Did not issue licenses or receive court direction (all others)

Due to perceived ambiguity in New Mexico's laws regarding marriage, counties in the state differed in their treatment of same-sex couples seeking marriage licenses prior to the New Mexico Supreme Court ruling on December 19, 2013.

=== 2004 Sandoval County marriages ===
On February 20, 2004, at the time of the widely publicized same-sex weddings in San Francisco, California, the Sandoval County Clerk, Victoria Dunlap, a married Republican with two children, began issuing marriage licenses to same-sex couples. Dunlap had called the county attorney for input after receiving an inquiry about issuing a marriage license to a same-sex couple. The county attorney found that gender was only mentioned on the marriage license application form and advised her to consult the Attorney General, Patricia A. Madrid. She sought advice from several state officials for several days without success and decided to issue licenses to same-sex couples beginning on February 20. She told the Albuquerque Journal: "This has nothing to do with politics or morals. If there are no legal grounds that say this should be prohibited, I can't withhold it. ... This office won't say no until shown it's not permissible."

The Sandoval County Courthouse was quickly thronged by same-sex couples applying for marriage licenses when Dunlap's decision was reported. Two local ministers officiated at marriage ceremonies for 26 couples on the courthouse steps on February 20. According to a suit filed against Dunlap in July by the Attorney General, 66 licenses had been issued and by March 23 some 64 of the couples had married "as evidenced by the return and filing of licenses and certificates of marriage".

Later that day, Attorney General Madrid issued an opinion stating that the licenses were "invalid under state law", citing the license application form and several statutes and court decisions. The Sandoval County Clerk's Office stopped issuing them the same day. The Sandoval County Commission voted on February 23 to allow couples married on the 20th to register their marriages. A district court judge later issued a restraining order against Dunlap, prohibiting her from issuing any further licenses to same-sex couples for the duration of her term as county clerk, which ended on January 1, 2005. Dunlap then filed a motion with the New Mexico Supreme Court for permission to continue issuing the licenses, but on July 8, 2004, the court rejected the motion. The restraining order was never lifted. County and state officials criticized Dunlap, and the Sandoval County Republican Central Committee censured her and said she "brought disgrace to the party as a whole". Dunlap did not seek reelection.

The validity of the same-sex marriages licensed in 2004 remained uncertain, though in 2010 a New Mexico court approved a divorce for one of the marriages. On August 9, 2010, State District Judge Sarah Singleton ruled that the marriage license issued to one same-sex couple in 2004 was valid and subject to divorce proceedings, but she did not otherwise address the legal status of same-sex marriage in the state. On August 28, 2013, Attorney General Gary King said the licenses remain "presumptively valid" until a court rules otherwise.

=== 2013 developments ===
==== Counties issuing marriage licenses ====
On August 21, 2013, officials in Doña Ana County began issuing marriage licenses to same-sex couples at the courthouse in Las Cruces. Doña Ana County Clerk Lynn Ellins announced the change of policy, stating, "After careful review of New Mexico's laws it is clear that the state's marriage statutes are gender neutral and do not expressly prohibit Doña Ana County from issuing marriage licenses to same-gender couples. Any further denial of marriage licenses to these couples violates the United States and New Mexico Constitution and the New Mexico Human Rights Act. Doña Ana County is upholding New Mexico law by issuing these marriage licenses, and I see no reason to make committed couples in Doña Ana County wait another minute to marry." Approximately two dozen same-sex couples received licenses that day, and about 90 couples by Friday, August 23, including some from the neighboring state of Texas. A group of Republican state legislators announced their intention to seek a court order to stop the county from issuing marriage licenses to same-sex couples; Sharer v. Ellins. Governor Susana Martinez reiterated her opposition to same-sex marriage, as well as her position that the legalization of same-sex unions should only be approved by a vote of the people. Attorney General Gary King, a Democrat, said his office would take no action to stop Ellins from issuing licenses to same-sex couples. "We feel like our position that the laws aren't constitutional presents a barrier from us bringing action in that suit," said King, referring to parts of the New Mexico Administrative Code that make gendered references to married persons.

On March 19, Santa Fe Mayor David Coss, City Councilor Patti Bushee and City Attorney Geno Zamora announced that a resolution recognizing same-sex marriages would be introduced at the next Santa Fe City Council meeting on March 27. Zamora released a legal opinion that "New Mexico's statutory definition of marriage is gender-neutral." Coss urged county clerks to issue marriage licenses to same-sex couples. However, Santa Fe County Clerk Geraldine Salazar said she would not issue them until the law was clarified by state courts or the New Mexico Legislature. Bushee said she expected the issue to reach the New Mexico Supreme Court. On April 24, 2013, by a vote of five to one with two abstentions, the Santa Fe City Council passed a motion recognizing same-sex marriage as legal in New Mexico and advising county clerks to issue marriage licenses to same-sex couples. On July 20, 2013, the Santa Fe County Commission approved a similar resolution. Salazar began issuing licenses to same-sex couples on August 23, following an order issued by a state district judge the day before in Hanna v. Salazar.

On August 26, 2013, in Griego v. Oliver, an Albuquerque judge ruled in favor of a lesbian couple and ordered Bernalillo County Clerk Maggie Toulouse Oliver, a self-identified proponent of legalized same-sex marriage, to issue marriage licenses to same-sex couples in Bernalillo County, the state's largest county by population. Judge Alan Malott's opinion stated that any laws that contradict New Mexico's gender-neutral language on marriage and the state's Human Rights Act are unconstitutional. On August 27, in compliance with this court order, Oliver began issuing marriage licenses to same-sex couples. On August 27, San Miguel County Clerk Melanie Rivera said her county would follow the lead of the three other New Mexico counties in issuing gender-neutral marriage licenses to same-sex couples. Valencia County followed suit that same day, when County Clerk Peggy Carabajal began issuing licenses, becoming the first Republican county clerk in New Mexico since Victoria Dunlap nine years prior to issue same-sex marriage licenses.

In Stark v. Martinez, a district judge issued a writ of mandamus similar to those in the Santa Fe and Bernalillo county lawsuits, ordering the county clerk in Taos County to issue marriage licenses to same-sex couples or otherwise explain why she would not. The Taos County Clerk, Anna Martinez, said she would not contest the ruling and confirmed the county would begin issuing marriage licenses to same-sex couples on August 28. The court order came hours after Martinez said she would not issue same-sex marriage licenses unless ordered to do so, declaring, "I have to follow the law, and the law requires that marriage licenses state the male and female."

On August 27, Los Alamos County Clerk Sharon Stover said she would not issue marriage licenses to same-sex couples until she received a court order instructing her to do so. She said "I want to have a good law that will hold up for all people. We need a ruling from the State Supreme Court." On August 29, in Newton v. Stover, Judge Sheri Raphaelson ordered Stover to issue the licenses or appear on September 4 to explain her refusal to do so. On September 3, Stover announced she would not issue marriage licenses to same-sex couples and would appear in court on September 4 to argue her case. She said:

[A]s Clerk, I am required to uphold the laws of the State of New Mexico. I based my denial of a license last week on the actual language contained in the statutes. The statements contained on the marriage license that is issued by the Clerk's office, as set forth in State law, requires a male and female or bride and groom applicant. I respect and value the rights of each person to be treated as equally and fairly as an individual as our Constitution states. Clearly, the marriage license in State statute has not been updated since 1961. It does not work for same sex couples, and that is a matter for the legislature to fix, not a Clerk and not a District Judge.

On September 4, after hearing Stover's arguments, Raphaelson ordered her to issue the marriage licenses. Los Alamos County began issuing marriage licenses to same-sex couples later that afternoon, although Stover said she would continue to use forms that stated "male" and "female" for the individuals entering into marriage until the New Mexico Legislature issued new, gender-neutral licenses.

Robert Zamarripa, the Grant County Clerk, said on August 27 that he was waiting for instructions from a court of law before issuing same-sex marriage licenses. The Grant County Clerk's Office turned away at least two same-sex couples seeking marriage licenses in Silver City, the county seat. In Katz v. Zamarripa, District Judge J.C. Robinson ordered Zamarripa to begin issuing same-sex marriage licenses on September 3 or else appear in court. Zamarripa said that his office would begin providing the licenses during the second week of September. Grant County began issuing licenses to same-sex couples on September 9, according to local media.

==== Counties not issuing marriage licenses ====
On August 27, Sandoval County Clerk Eileen Garbagni acknowledged "nonstop" calls to issue marriage licenses to same-sex couples, but said that on the advice of the county attorney she would not join other county clerks in issuing them without a court order. On August 31, in Gering v. New Mexico, the American Civil Liberties Union filed a lawsuit against Garbagni and the state on behalf of a lesbian couple who were denied a marriage license. Judge James Lawrence Sanchez, to whom the case was originally assigned, recused himself on September 5, and the case was reassigned to Judge George P. Eichwald. Eichwald put the case on hold on September 12, pending the outcome of Griego v. Oliver in the New Mexico Supreme Court.

On August 27, Union County Clerk Mary Lou Harkin said in response to questions about whether the county would follow Bernalillo County in licensing same-sex marriages, "Not yet." Harkin said she would "hold off for now" until she received a court order "or other direction".

== Court cases ==
=== Griego v. Oliver ===
==== District Court ====
On March 21, 2013, in Griego v. Oliver, Rose Griego and her partner, along with another lesbian couple, represented by the American Civil Liberties Union and others, filed a lawsuit in State District Court in Albuquerque challenging the Bernalillo County clerk's refusal to issue them marriage licenses. On June 6, the plaintiffs filed an amended complaint where they were joined by three more same-sex couples seeking relief. On August 16, the plaintiffs filed a second amended complaint, adding one more couple seeking relief, while also claiming that New Mexico's refusal to recognize their marriages "deprives [the plaintiffs] of hundreds of protections, benefits, and obligations of marriage that the federal government now provides to married same-sex couples in light of the United States Supreme Court's decision in United States v. Windsor."

On August 26, District Court Judge Alan M. Malott ruled for the plaintiffs, finding that prohibiting the issuance of marriage licenses to same-sex couples "[is] unconstitutional and unenforceable under Article II, Section 18, New Mexico Constitution." He ordered the clerks in Bernalillo and Santa Fe counties to issue marriage licenses to all same-sex couples otherwise qualified. The Bernalillo County Clerk's Office indicated it would do so beginning on August 27, and Santa Fe County was already issuing them.

On August 29, 2013, New Mexico's 33 county clerks voted to ask the New Mexico Supreme Court to rule on the legality of same-sex marriage. The Supreme Court on August 16 had rejected a request to consolidate and hear the same-sex marriage lawsuits being heard in several lower courts. On September 5, an attorney for the New Mexico Association of Counties filed a request on the clerks' behalf to be allowed to intervene in Griego v. Oliver. The clerks were not appealing the decision in that case, but asked the Supreme Court to halt the lawsuits against them in district court until it clarified New Mexico law for the lower courts, including the issuance of licenses to same-sex couples and the clerks' authority to modify the forms used. The two clerks who were defendants in Griego v. Oliver were not joining their peers in this action because they were already parties to the case. The Supreme Court heard the Association's petition on October 23. On September 3, Judge Malott reopened the case, and allowed the group to intervene and granted final declaratory judgement to the plaintiffs, allowing the Association to seek further review by the Supreme Court.

==== New Mexico Supreme Court ====
On September 5, 2013, the Association of Counties petitioned the New Mexico Supreme Court for a "writ of superintending control", a legal measure which would "create a definitive—and uniform—legal opinion for clerks across the state to rely on rather than waiting for possibly lengthy appeals out of several counties" raised at the district court level. On September 6, the New Mexico Supreme Court docketed this case for an extraordinary writ proceeding. Oral arguments took place on October 23, 2013. While the court did not issue an opinion on October 23, same-sex marriage advocates said they were encouraged by the justices' statements, which the Albuquerque Journal said included "tough" and "pointed questions" for attorneys representing Republican state legislators seeking a court ban on same-sex marriage in New Mexico. Albuquerque-market television news station KRQE reported that Republican Senator Bill Sharer had suggested that voters could remove Supreme Court justices from office, vote out state legislators or pass a new constitutional amendment if they were unhappy with how the court ruled.

On December 19, the Supreme Court ruled unanimously that the Constitution of New Mexico required the extension of marriage rights to same-sex couples. Its decision said that the Equal Protection Clause under Article II, Section 18 of the New Mexico Constitution required that "All rights, protections, and responsibilities that result from the marital relationship shall apply equally to both same-gender and opposite-gender married couples." The decision made New Mexico the 17th U.S. state to recognize same-sex marriages. The following day, the clerk and chief deputy clerk in Roosevelt County resigned. The clerk said she could not comply with the court's ruling with "a clear conscience" and added: "I felt like I'd be letting down the majority of people who voted for me."

In response to the Supreme Court decision, Senator Bill Sharer proposed a joint resolution that, if passed by both chambers of the New Mexico Legislature, would have put a constitutional amendment defining marriage as "a union of one man and one woman" to a popular vote. On January 6, 2014, Governor Martinez said she would not support efforts to reverse the Supreme Court's decision by enacting a state constitutional amendment banning same-sex marriage. She said: "I think what I said before was that yes, the people should have decided on it, but the Supreme Court has decided. ... And it's now the law of the land."

=== Hanna v. Salazar ===
On June 6, 2013, Alexander Hanna and Yon Hudson, represented by Brian Egolf, Kate Ferlic and John Day, filed a similar lawsuit, Hanna v. Salazar, in district court against the Santa Fe County Clerk, Geraldine Salazar, and the Attorney General. On June 27, following the U.S. Supreme Court ruling in United States v. Windsor, the lawsuit was withdrawn from district court and filed in the New Mexico Supreme Court. On July 22, Attorney General King told the court that "New Mexico's guarantee of equal protection to its citizens demands that same-sex couples be permitted to enjoy the benefits of marriage in the same way and to the same extent as other New Mexico citizens", but he argued that the court lacked the authority to order a county clerk to issue the marriage license as the plaintiffs had requested, which only officers of the state's executive branch could do. He warned the court that doing so could invite myriad lawsuits "concerning any dispute a party has with any local or county official". On August 16, the Supreme Court declined to hear this case and a similar one, but said that the plaintiffs were entitled to an "expedited review" in district court.

On August 22, 2013, New Mexico District Judge Sarah Singleton ordered Salazar to begin issuing marriage licenses to same-sex couples or show cause why the county should not comply. Egolf told reporters, "This will be the first time a court anywhere in New Mexico ... has ordered same-sex couples to be married." Salazar said she was "a fervent supporter of same-sex marriage in New Mexico" and would issue the licenses to Hanna and Hudson and any other qualified same-sex couples. She began issuing marriage licenses to same-sex couples, including Hanna and Hudson, on August 23. About a dozen same-sex couples were married in a joint ceremony in the county commission chambers. Subsequently, Salazar, in her official capacity as county clerk, was listed as a defendant in Griego v. Oliver, with this related case before the New Mexico Supreme Court to determine statewide applicability of district court legalization of same-sex marriage.

=== Stark v. Martinez ===
On August 28, 2013, in Stark v. Martinez, New Mexico District Judge Jeff F. McElroy ordered Taos County Clerk Anna Martinez to start issuing same-sex marriage licenses or to appear to show cause why she could not. The clerk said she would not contest the order and would begin issuing marriage licenses to same-sex couples.

=== Sharer v. Ellins ===
On August 29, 2013, in Sharer v. Ellins, seven Republican state legislators–senators William Sharer and Steven Neville, and representatives David Gallegos, Jimmie C. Hall, Yvette Herrell, Dennis Roch, and James Strickler–filed a lawsuit in the Third Judicial District Court against Doña Ana County Clerk Lynn Ellins seeking an immediate stay of the issuance of marriage licenses to same-sex couples. The case was assigned to Judge James T. Martin. On September 3, 2013, eight additional Republican lawmakers joined the suit. The group filed similar suits against the clerks of Valencia and San Miguel counties. After Ellins objected to Judge Martin, he recused himself and Judge Manuel I. Arrieta was assigned to the case on September 17, 2013. The court ordered sua sponte that the matter be stayed under October 23, when oral arguments took place in Griego in the New Mexico Supreme Court. Following the court's ruling in Griego on December 19, both the state legislators and Ellins asked Judge Arrieta to dismiss the case.

== Native American nations ==
Same-sex marriage is not recognized in the Navajo Nation, following the passage of the Diné Marriage Act in 2005. A bill to legalize same-sex marriage was introduced to the Navajo Nation Council by Delegate Eugene Tso of Chinle in July 2022. Another bill was introduced by Delegate Seth Damon in June 2023. It would allow Navajo Nation citizens to receive marriage licenses through the tribe and require the tribal government to recognize same-sex marriages licensed outside the reservation. President Buu Nygren supports the bill.

While there are no records of same-sex marriages as understood from a Western perspective being performed in Native American cultures, there is evidence for identities and behaviours that may be placed on the LGBT spectrum. Many of these cultures recognized two-spirit individuals who were born male but wore women's clothing and performed everyday household work and artistic handiwork which were regarded as belonging to the feminine sphere. Navajo culture has traditionally recognized two-spirit individuals, known in the Navajo language as nádleehi (pronounced [nátɬèːhì]). While the nádleehi had access to both masculine and feminine spheres of work, aside from hunting and warfare, they typically pursued feminine activities such as pottery making, weaving and tanning of hides, but also chanting, which was primarily a men's activity. Associated with prosperity and believed to have originated in the third world of the Holy People, the nádleehi directed the planting and the fieldwork, and generally functioned as head of a household. They were known for their skills in matchmaking and mediated between the sexes in matters of conflict and love. Traditionally, "real" nádleehi did not marry and had sexual intercourse exclusively with men, while "those who pretend to be nádleehi" could marry either men or women but if they married they would generally take on the clothing and activities of a man. The nádleehi status thus created the possibility of a marriage between two biological males in Navajo culture.

Similarly, the Zuni people have traditionally recognized two-spirit individuals, known in their language as lhamana (or łamana, pronounced [ˈɬamana]). The lhamana took on women's clothing and feminine activities, including weaving and pottery making, but were—like every man but hardly ever a woman—initiated into the ko'tikili. They married men, without indication of polygyny, though a famous Zuni lhamana, We'wha, was said to have remained unmarried, but had several children. Among the Tewa, two-spirit individuals are known as kwidó. The kwidó had sexual intercourse with men, women and other kwidó. Among the Keres people, two-spirit people wore women's clothing and had a "preference for feminine over masculine tasks". The Acoma and Laguna Keres call them kokwimu. In the language of the Mescalero and Chiricahua Apaches, they are referred to as ndé ’isdzán (pronounced [nᵈɛ́ ʔìstsán]).

== Economic impact ==
In 2006, a study by the Williams Institute at the University of California, Los Angeles concluded that allowing same-sex couples to marry would have a positive effect on New Mexico's state budget. Allowing same-sex couples to marry would result in a net gain of approximately $1.5 million to $2 million each year for the state. This net impact would be the result of savings in expenditures on state means-tested public benefit programs and an increase in sales and lodging tax revenue from weddings and wedding-related tourism.

== Demographics and marriage statistics ==
In April 2008, the Williams Institute, using data from the United States Census Bureau, issued a "Census Snapshot" that concluded: "While in many respects New Mexico's same-sex couples look like married couples, same-sex couples with children have fewer economic resources to provide for their families than married parents and lower rates of home ownership." Analyzing census data on same-sex unmarried-partner households, the report determined that in 2000 there were 4,496 same-sex couples living in New Mexico, and that by 2005 the number of same-sex couples had increased to 6,063. There were more female same-sex couples (58%) than male same-sex couples (42%) in New Mexico, and individuals in same-sex couples were, on average, 42 years old, and significantly younger than individuals in married couples (48 years old). Same-sex couples also lived in every county in the state and constituted 1.2% of coupled households. 71% of individuals in same-sex couples were employed, compared to 60% of married individuals, with the average household income of same-sex couples being at $53,720, compared to $59,692 for married couples. 27% of same-sex couples in New Mexico were raising children under the age of 18, and in 2005 an estimated 3,624 children were living in households headed by same-sex couples.

The 2020 U.S. census showed that there were 5,253 married same-sex couple households (2,109 male couples and 3,144 female couples) and 4,264 unmarried same-sex couple households in New Mexico.

== Public opinion ==
Public opinion for same-sex marriage in New Mexico
Poll source	Dates administered	Sample size	Margin of error	Support	Opposition	Do not know / refused
Public Religion Research Institute	March 9 – December 7, 2023	540 adults	?	71%	29%	<0.5%
Public Religion Research Institute	March 11 – December 14, 2022	?	?	72%	28%	<0.5%
Public Religion Research Institute	March 8 – November 9, 2021	?	?	68%	31%	1%
Public Religion Research Institute	January 7 – December 20, 2020	397 adults	?	77%	15%	8%
Public Religion Research Institute	April 5 – December 23, 2017	534 adults	?	63%	30%	7%
Public Religion Research Institute	May 18, 2016 – January 10, 2017	726 adults	?	54%	35%	11%
Public Religion Research Institute	April 29, 2015 – January 7, 2016	589 adults	?	58%	34%	8%
Public Religion Research Institute	April 2, 2014 – January 4, 2015	371 adults	?	58%	36%	6%
Public Policy Polling	March 20–23, 2014	674 registered voters	± 3.8%	47%	45%	8%
Anzalone Liszt Grove Research	September 18–22, 2013	502 registered voters	± 4.4%	51%	42%	7%
Public Policy Polling	December 11–13, 2011	500 voters	± 4.4%	45%	43%	12%
Public Policy Polling	June 23–26, 2011	732 voters	± 3.6%	42%	48%	10%

The June 2011 Public Policy Polling (PPP) survey found that 42% of New Mexico voters thought same-sex marriage should be legal, while 48% thought it should be illegal and 10% were not sure. A separate question in the same survey found that 68% of voters supported the legal recognition of same-sex couples, with 37% supporting same-sex marriage, 31% supporting civil unions, 30% opposing all legal recognition, and 2% being undecided. The December 2011 survey by the same polling organization found that 45% of New Mexico voters thought same-sex marriage should be legal, while 43% thought it should be illegal and 12% were not sure. A separate question in the same survey found that 67% of voters supported the legal recognition of same-sex couples, with 42% supporting same-sex marriage, 25% supporting civil unions, 32% opposing all legal recognition, and 2% being undecided. The March 2014 PPP survey showed that 74% of voters supported the legal recognition of same-sex couples, with 45% supporting same-sex marriage, 29% supporting civil unions, 24% opposing all legal recognition, and 2% being unsure.

== See also ==
- LGBT rights in New Mexico
- Same-sex marriage in the United States

== Bibliography ==
- Pinello, Daniel R (2006). America's Struggle for Same-Sex Marriage. Cambridge University Press. ISBN 9780521848565. (Chapter 1 contains interviews with Victoria Dunlap and couples who participated in the 2004 Sandoval County marriages)
