= LGBTQ rights in New Mexico =

- New Mexico (US)
- Legal status: Legal since 1975
- Gender identity: Transgender people may alter their legal gender
- Discrimination protections: Protections for sexual orientation and gender identity

Family rights
- Recognition of relationships: Same-sex marriage since 2013
- Adoption: Same-sex couples allowed to adopt

Lesbian, gay, bisexual, transgender, and queer (LGBTQ) people in the U.S. state of New Mexico enjoy the same rights as non-LGBTQ people. New Mexico has seen prominent advances in gay and lesbian rights in recent decades. Same-sex sexual activity has been legal since 1975. Same-sex marriage is legal statewide in New Mexico, as is adoption and access to fertility treatments for lesbian couples. Same-sex couples have had the same rights as heterosexual married couples since 2013. Discrimination on the basis of sexual orientation and gender identity is banned statewide in the areas of employment, housing and public accommodations. Additionally, conversion therapy on minors is prohibited in the state, and transgender people are able to change their legal gender.

The state capital, Santa Fe, is often cited as one of the United States' gay capitals, and the state's largest city Albuquerque, including its large metropolitan area, is often referred to as a "gay-friendly" city. Opinion polls have shown that a majority of New Mexicans support LGBTQ rights and same-sex marriage; 2018 polling from the Public Religion Research Institute showed that 73% of New Mexicans supported anti-discrimination legislation protecting LGBTQ people.

== History ==
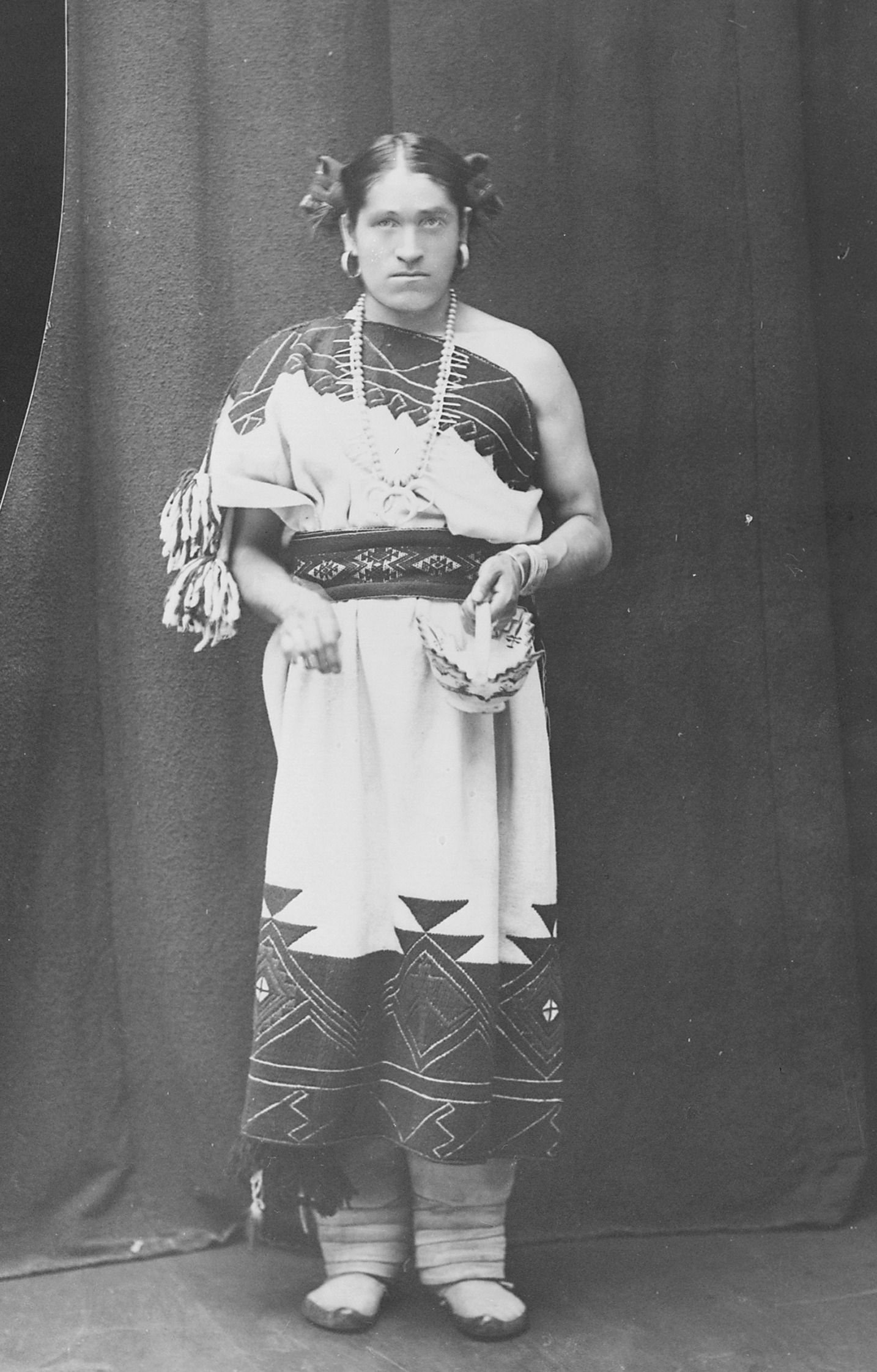
We'wha (1849-96), a Zuni lhamana

In modern-day New Mexico, Native American people groups include the Navajo, the Zuni, the Apache, the Tewa, the Tiwa, and the Keres people. Similarly to many Native American tribes in the United States, these groups have traditions of cross-dressing and gender variance and had perceptions of gender and human sexuality different from that of the Western world. There were no legal or social punishments for engaging in same-sex sexual activity.

Nádleehi (Navajo: naadleeh or nádleehé; literally one who constantly transforms) refers to individuals who are a "male-bodied person with a feminine nature". Historically, the Navajo recognized four gender roles: asdzáán (feminine female), hastiin (masculine male), dilbaa (masculine female), and nádleehi (feminine male). The nádleehi identity is fluid, and such individuals may display both male and female characteristics. Due to the perceived "balance" between both sexes, they were typically chosen for certain societal and communal roles, such as spiritual healers. They would traditionally wear female clothes and do female work, and some would have sexual relations with men which was accepted by the tribe. The Zuni people also recognize these types of gender roles. The terms lhamana (literally behave like a woman) refers to people assigned male at birth but who typically dress, act and behave as female, and katsotse refers to female-bodied people who live and behave as male. Other tribes have similar individuals, known as ńdé?isdzan among the Mescalero Apache, lhunide among the Tiwa people, kwido among the Tewa, kokwimu among the Acoma and Laguna pueblos, and kokwima among the San Felipe, Santa Ana and Kewa pueblos. Nowadays, the term "two-spirit" is increasingly used to refer to these identities. As a result of colonization, much of this cultural acceptance has disappeared. Even among the Native Americans, societal perceptions began to change. Owing to the introduction of a more stringent set of beliefs on gender and sexuality by the colonizers, Navajo nádleehi became the subject of ridicule. Today, LGBTQ Navajo may find it difficult being accepted by their family, with 70% of LGBT Navajo youth reportedly attempting suicide. Spanish missionaries took repeated notes of these traditions, with one Franciscan missionary stating "that these accursed people will disappear with the growth of the missions. The abominable vice will be eliminated to the extent that the Catholic faith and all the other virtues are firmly implanted there, for the glory of God and the benefits of these poor ignorants". Among the Hopi, Christian converts were prohibited from attending the traditional snake dance because "male cross-dressing could be observed". Jonathan Ned Katz notes, "the Christianization of Native Americans and the colonial appropriation of the continent by white, Western 'civilization' included the attempt by the conquerors to eliminate various traditional forms of Indian homosexuality—as part of their attempt to destroy that Native culture which might fuel resistance—a form of cultural genocide involving both Native Americans and gay people". Will Roscoe in his work The Zuni Man-Woman writes that the "prevalence of sodomy" and the tolerance or even respect of transgender people fueled the Spanish explorers' argument for the colonization of native peoples and their lands in the name of Christianity.

Shortly following the creation of the New Mexico Territory, the Territorial Legislature passed a law adopting the common law in criminal cases in 1851, thus making sodomy a capital offense. In 1876, the territory's first sodomy law was enacted, providing a penalty of at least one year imprisonment and/or a fine of 1,000 dollars, with no established maximums. As was the case for most of the United States at the time, the statute prohibited both homosexual and heterosexual sodomy, and applied to consenting adults as well. In 1953, the New Mexico Supreme Court held that fellatio was not outlawed by the state's sodomy statute. Two year later, the New Mexico Legislature reworded the sodomy statute to include acts of fellatio. The penalty was set at 10 years' imprisonment. In 1967, in the case of State v. Putman, the New Mexico Court of Appeals held that cunnilingus was criminal under state law—again whether heterosexual or homosexual.

== Legality of same-sex sexual activity ==
New Mexico repealed its anti-sodomy law in 1975, making it one of the first U.S. states to do so.

The first attempt at repealing the state's sodomy law occurred in 1961. The bill passed the House of Representatives by a vote of 37 to 28, but was not successful in the Senate. The proposed bill uniquely referred to anal sex and oral sex as "variant sexual practices" rather than "deviate" as was commonly the case in U.S. state statutes at the time.

In 1972, Judge Lewis R. Sutin, dissenting in the case of State v. Trejo, described the sodomy law as "unconstitutional and void because it is vague, overbroad, uncertain, and is an unreasonable exercise of the police power of the state." He went on to ask if it does not

[...] seem odd that the statute allows the state to punish consenting adults for private sexual deviations, and married people for the private use of their marital intimacy even though they seek stability instead of divorce? In denying consensual private sex relations between adults, the legislature makes criminals out of a large section of ordinary, normal people in New Mexico who have left the biblical text and seek contentment under modern professional guidance. Public policy cannot sanction this type of legislation. The social revolution on the subject of private consensual sexual relations between two consenting adults has begun legally in the courts and in the legislature. New Mexico should follow this trend.

An attempt to reinstate the sodomy law failed in 1986.

== Recognition of same-sex relationships ==
State marriage laws do not explicitly require married couples to be of different genders and prior to December 2013 state courts had not ruled on the question of same-sex marriage. New Mexico has never recognised alternative relationship recognition schemes, such as civil unions or domestic partnerships. In January 2011, state Attorney General Gary King issued an opinion that valid same-sex marriages contracted in other states "would likely be valid in New Mexico".

On December 19, 2013, the New Mexico Supreme Court ruled that the state must provide same-sex couples with the same marriage rights as different-sex couples, making New Mexico the 17th U.S. state to recognize same-sex marriage.

New Mexico has provided benefits to same-sex partners of state employees since 2003.

In March 2019, the New Mexico Legislature passed a bill in both chambers unanimously (62–0 in the House and 39–0 in the Senate) to codify same-sex marriage in state statutes. The bill was signed into law in April by Governor Michelle Lujan Grisham and went into effect on July 1, 2019.

== Adoption and parenting ==
New Mexico allows single persons to adopt children. The state has no prohibition on adoption by same-sex couples or second-parent adoptions, and as stated, allows those adoptions.

Lesbian couples can access in vitro fertilization and donor insemination without regard to their sexual orientation or marital status. State law recognizes the non-genetic, non-gestational mother as a legal parent to a child born via donor insemination, irrespective of the marital status of the parents. In addition, no statute or case law prohibits surrogacy. As a result, both gestational and traditional surrogacy are practiced in the state, and such contracts are generally recognized by the courts.

In June 2012, following the separation of a lesbian couple, the state's highest court granted parental rights to the one who had been unable to adopt her partner's adopted child but who had helped raise and had supported the child financially.

== Discrimination protections ==
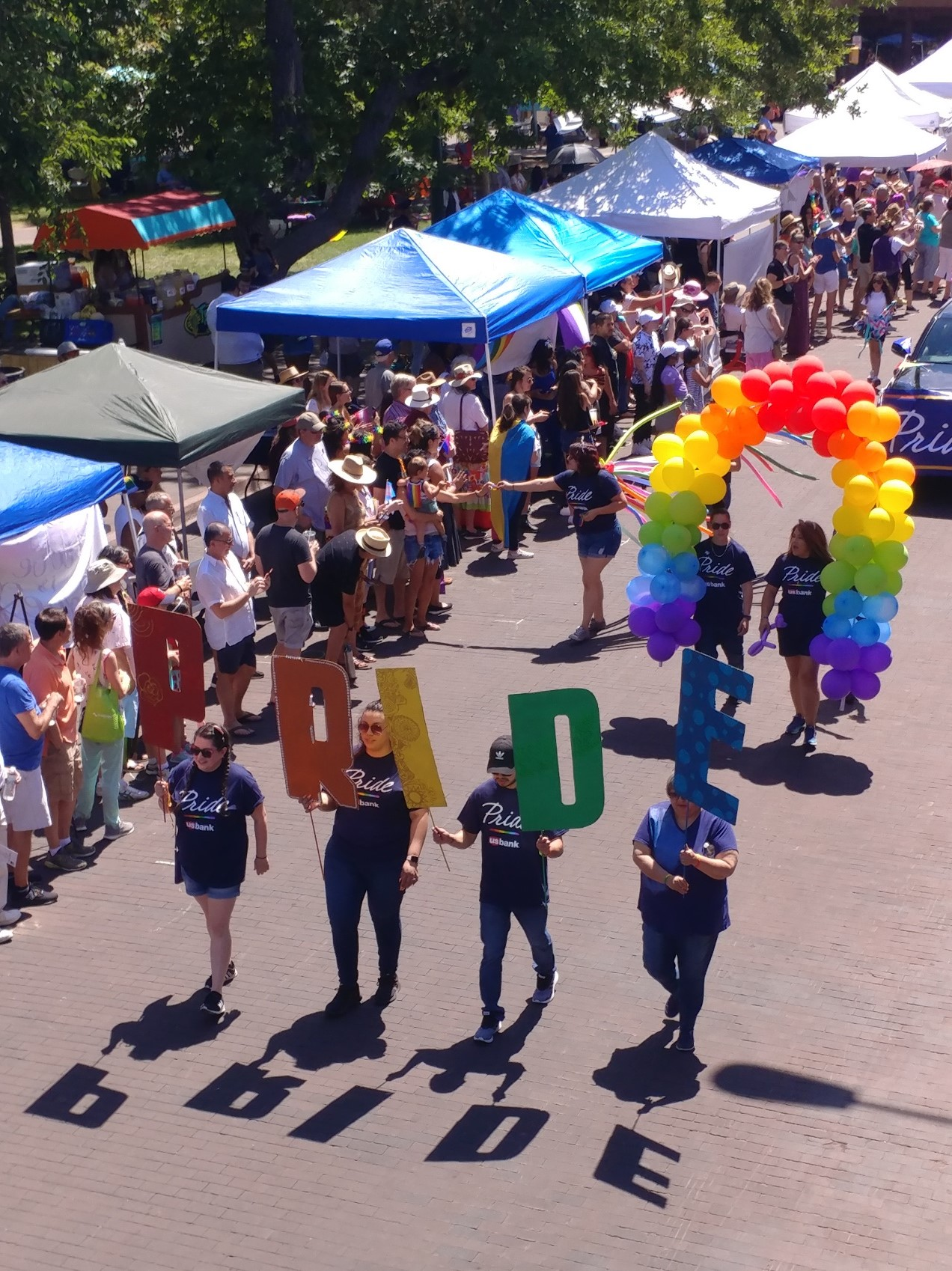
Santa Fe Pride parade on June 29, 2019

Since the passage of An Act Relating to Human Rights, which became effective on July 1, 2003, New Mexico law has outlawed unfair discrimination based on sexual orientation and gender identity "in matters of employment, housing, credit, public accommodations and union membership." An executive order issued by Governor Toney Anaya in 1985 prohibits discrimination in public employment on the basis of sexual orientation.

In June 2012, a three-judge panel of the New Mexico Court of Appeals unanimously upheld a claim against a photography studio that refused to take pictures of a same-sex couple's commitment ceremony in 2006. On August 22, 2013, the New Mexico Supreme Court upheld that ruling in a unanimous decision in Elane Photography v. Willock. It held that enforcing the anti-discrimination provisions of state law did not violate the photographer's free speech rights. The U.S. Supreme Court announced it would not consider an appeal in the case on April 7, 2014.

In March 2019, the New Mexico Legislature passed a bill in both chambers unanimously (59–0 in the House and 36–0 in the Senate) to repeal an explicit "15 or more employees" exemption, which had exempted businesses with less than 15 employees from the state's anti-discrimination law. The bill was signed into law by Governor Michelle Lujan Grisham and went into effect on July 1, 2019.

In March 2023, a bill passed the New Mexico Legislature to remove loopholes and explicitly include local entities and counties (i.e. schools, universities and/or government-run agencies) - to prevent discrimination and human rights violations within New Mexico. The Governor of New Mexico signed the bill into law, effective immediately under an "emergency clause".

In May 2024, Albuquerque City Council voted to amend the city's Human Rights Ordinance to align with the state law including prohibitions on discrimination based on sexual orientation, gender identity, and/or pregnancy status alongside other changes recommended by the Albuquerque Human Rights Board.

=== Hate crime law ===
Since 2003, New Mexico's hate crime law has directly and explicitly addressed violence and hate crimes committed solely based on the victim's or victims' actual or perceived race, religion, color, ancestry, national origin, gender, sexual orientation or gender identity.

=== Bullying in schools ===
In March 2019, the New Mexico Legislature passed a bill to protect students in state schools from bullying on the basis of sexual orientation and gender identity. The bill passed the House by a vote of 65–0 and the Senate by a vote of 33–14. It was signed into law in April by Governor Michelle Lujan Grisham and went into effect on July 1, 2019. The legislation requires school districts to adopt policies prohibiting bullying and cyberbullying, as well as procedures for reporting and investigation, disciplinary consequences, implementing prevention programs and training for all staff.

== Transgender rights ==
Transgender people are allowed to change their legal gender in New Mexico. In March 2019, a bill passed the New Mexico Legislature by a supermajority to repeal the 1984 sex reassignment surgery requirement. The bill would also explicitly provide a "neutral" sex designation, known as "X", alongside male and female, on birth certificates, driver's licenses and state IDs. The bill was passed 26–13 in the House and 33–14 in the Senate. It was signed into law by Governor Michelle Lujan Grisham and went into effect on November 1, 2019.

In March 2019, a bill passed the New Mexico Legislature to allow gender-neutral bathrooms. The bill was passed 54–12 in the House and 23–15 in the Senate. It was signed into law by Governor Michelle Lujan Grisham and went into effect on July 1, 2019. The measure requires New Mexico businesses and public facilities that have single-occupancy restrooms to mark them as gender-neutral, available to any person regardless of gender identity or sex.

Prior to November 2019, the New Mexico Department of Vital Records would issue an amended birth certificate upon receipt of "a statement signed under penalty of perjury by the person in charge of an institution or from the attending physician indicating that the sex of an individual born in this state has been changed by surgical procedure, together with a certified copy of an order changing the name of the person." Since November 1, 2019, New Mexico has issued corrected birth certificates to transgender people without the requirement that they undergo surgery or other medical operations. They need simply to submit a completed "Request to Change Gender Designation on a Birth Certificate" form and pay the applicable fees. Minors require parental consent as well. Applicants for a corrected driver's license and ID must submit a "Request for Sex Designation Change" form with the Motor Vehicles Division.

In March 2023, a bill (HB7) formally passed the New Mexico Legislature and was signed into law by the Governor of New Mexico - to legally codify, protect and defend "gender affirming care, abortion, sexual orientation protections and sexual reassignment surgery" for adults who want it on request without restrictions - even from interstate travellers. New Mexico is officially "a sanctuary state" for transgender youths, surrounded by jurisdictions attempting to ban gender-affirming care for minors - except for Colorado to the north that has similar policies and laws to New Mexico. That same month, a bill (HB31) passed the New Mexico Legislature to formally repeal the archaic and outdated requirement to publish a formal change of legal name on a birth certificate within a newspaper - the current laws potentially risks the privacy, safety and lives of transgender individuals within the state. The Governor of New Mexico signed the bill into law.

In 2026, following the creation of a new rule by the Trump administration that would prevent gender-affirming care from being covered by federal healthcare programs like Medicaid, the state's health care authority announced that they would use state funds to maintain coverage.

=== Sports ===
There is no state law in New Mexico prohibiting transgender girls from participating eligibility being determined by birth certificate, original or amended. The New Mexico Activities Association provides no further guidance.

== Conversion therapy ==
In 2017, Senator Jacob Candelaria and Representative G. Andres Romero sponsored SB 121, which would ban sexual orientation change efforts (conversion therapy) on minors. The New Mexico Senate approved the bill on February 16, 2017 by a 32–6 vote, and the New Mexico House of Representatives concurred on March 15, 2017 by a 44–23 vote. The bill was signed by Governor Susana Martinez on April 7, 2017, and went into effect on July 6, 2017.

== Gay panic defence ==
In the 2019 New Mexico legislative session, a bill to abolish the gay panic defence was passed unanimously by the New Mexico Senate by a vote of 40–0. However, the New Mexico House of Representatives took no action on the bill before it adjourned sine die on March 20. No similar bill was introduced in the 2020 New Mexico legislative session.

On January 31, 2021, another bill was introduced to repeal the gay panic defense. The bill passed by a vote of 41-0 in the Senate; however, the House again took no action on the bill again before it adjourned sine die. Legislation would need to be re-introduced in the 2022 legislative session.

In February 2022, the New Mexico Legislature passed an omnibus crime bill (HB68 - that also added amendments that repeals the common-law gay and trans panic defence). The New Mexico Governor Michelle Lujan Grisham signed the bill into law on March 9, 2022.

== LGBTQ data bill and executive order ==
In March 2021, a bill (SB316) “lapsed and died” due to not passing through the New Mexico Legislature within the 60-day session. However in August 2021, the Governor of New Mexico signed and implemented an executive order instead - for the immediate establishment and keeping of LGBTQ data, statistics, demographics and/or records (collected from LGBTQ New Mexico residents).

== Public opinion ==
A 2017 Public Religion Research Institute poll found that 63% of New Mexico residents supported same-sex marriage, while 30% were opposed and 7% were unsure. Additionally, 64% supported an anti-discrimination law covering sexual orientation and gender identity. 27% were opposed.

Public opinion for LGBTQ anti-discrimination laws in New Mexico
Poll source	Date(s) administered	Sample size	Margin of error	% support	% opposition	% no opinion
Public Religion Research Institute	January 2-December 30, 2019	452	?	68%	23%	9%
Public Religion Research Institute	January 3-December 30, 2018	406	?	73%	22%	5%
Public Religion Research Institute	April 5-December 23, 2017	534	?	64%	27%	9%
Public Religion Research Institute	April 29, 2015-January 7, 2016	589	?	75%	22%	3%

== Summary table ==
Same-sex sexual activity legal	Yes (Since 1975)
Equal age of consent (16)	Yes
Anti-discrimination laws in all areas	Yes (Since 2003 for both sexual orientation and gender identity; removal of legal loopholes and exemptions since 2023)
Same-sex marriages and recognition of same-sex couples	Yes / No (Since 2013, disputed in the San Ildefonso Pueblo; explicitly banned in the Navajo Nation since 2005)
LGBTQ data and statistics - for demographics collection purposes	Yes (Since 2021, by executive order)
Stepchild and joint adoption by same-sex couples	Yes
Lesbian, gay and bisexual people allowed to serve openly in the military	Yes (Since 2011)
Transgender people allowed to serve openly in the military	No (Since 2025)
Intersex people allowed to serve openly in the military	(Current DoD policy bans "hermaphrodites" from serving or enlisting in the military)
Gender-neutral bathrooms	Yes (Since 2019)
Right to change legal gender	Yes
Third gender option	Yes (Since 2019)
Access to IVF for lesbian couples	Yes
Conversion therapy banned on minors	Yes (Since 2017)
Surrogacy arrangements legal for gay male couples	Yes
MSMs allowed to donate blood	Yes / No (Since 2020; 3-month deferral period)
