= Cosmos Mindeleff =

American journalist (1863–1938)

Cosmos Mindeleff (1863–1938) started his career as assistant to his brother Victor Mindeleff, who was employed by the Bureau of American Ethnology to conduct studies of Pueblo architecture in the 1880s. In 1882, James Stevenson and the Mindeleffs visited Canyon de Chelly and Canyon del Muerto. In later years, Victor and Cosmos Mindeleff continued their research in Canyon de Chelly and Cosmos published the first authoritative archeological map of White House Ruins in 1893.

== Career in archaeology and ethnology ==
John Wesley Powell hired Cosmos and his brother Victor in 1881, when Powell was the director of the Bureau of American Ethnology in Washington, D.C., to come west for the Smithsonian Institution and survey the great pueblos of Arizona and New Mexico. After years of field-work, the Mindeleffs' field-party returned in 1888 to Washington, D.C., with their scientific findings, including many valuable archaeological artifacts. In 1890, Victor left the Smithsonian to pursue a career in architecture. In 1891, Cosmos came to Arizona to complete the stabilization of the Casa Grande ruins until there was a shortage of money and the work was stopped. Cosmos left Casa Grande and began to research the extensive ruins found along the Verde River instead. Accompanied by his wife Marion, Cosmos surveyed the river from its confluence with the Salt River, north to the Verde Valley and its confluence with Beaver Creek. By the time he finished, he had catalogued more than 50 major sites. His study of the indigenous cultures of the Verde Valley was published in 1896.

== Later life ==
After his Verde Valley study, Cosmos left the Bureau of Ethnology and became a newspaper reporter, working for the New York World, the New York American, and the New York Sun, for whom he traveled extensively, living in Paris, London, and Florence, Italy, and serving as the foreign editor. He also reported from Russia during the Bolshevik Revolution and from Europe during World War I. After leaving from the newspaper business, Cosmos and Marion retired to Carmel, New York, where Marion died in 1933. Cosmos died five years later, in 1938.

== Publications ==
- A Study of Pueblo Architecture: Tusayan and Cibola, with Victor Mindeleff
- The Cliff Ruins of Canyon de Chelly, Arizona
- Navaho Houses
- Casa Grande Ruin
- The Repair Of Casa Grande Ruin, Arizona, in 1891
- Aboriginal Remains in Verde Valley, Arizona
