= Stevenson Island (Wyoming) =

Island in Wyoming, USA

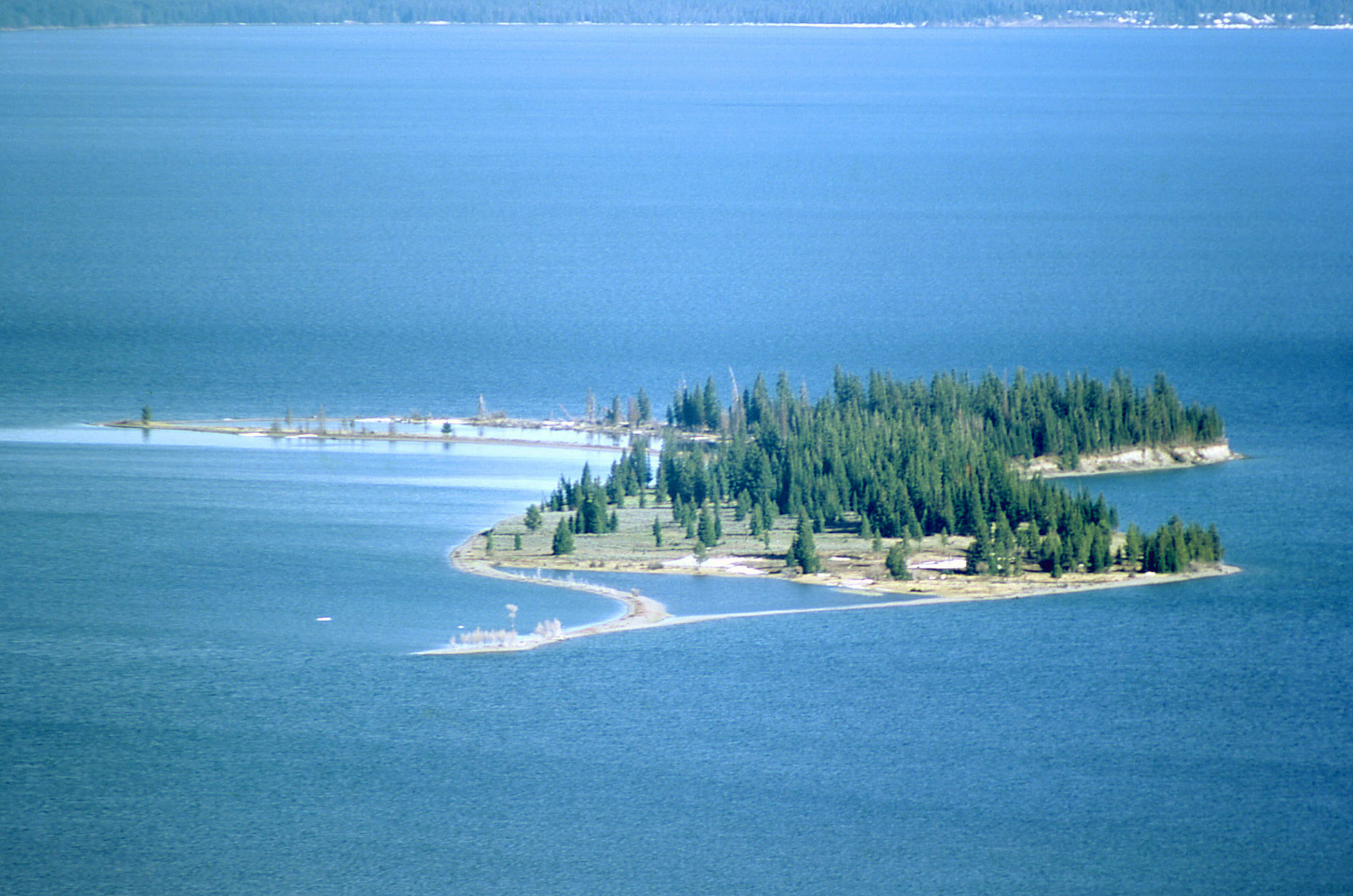

- Location within Wyoming

Geography
- Location: Wyoming
- Coordinates: 44°30′50″N 110°23′02″W
- Total islands: 1
- Highest elevation: 2,366 m (7762 ft)

Administration
- United States

Demographics
- Population: 0

Stevenson Island is a small, uninhabited island in Yellowstone Lake, Teton County, Wyoming. It was originally called Stevenson's Island after Colonel James D. Stevenson, and is now sometimes called Stevensons Island.

The island is long and narrow, generally oriented north to south. It is approximately 250 meters (820 feet) wide at its widest point and 1,800 meters (1.1 miles) long at its longest point. It is about 2.5 kilometres (1.6 mi) from the west shore of Yellowstone Lake, where Weasel Creek enters the lake.

== See also ==
- List of islands of Wyoming
