= List of islands of Wyoming =

Islands of the state of Wyoming
- Location of Wyoming within the United States

Geography
- Location: Wyoming
- Total islands: 35 named

Administration
- United States
- State: Wyoming

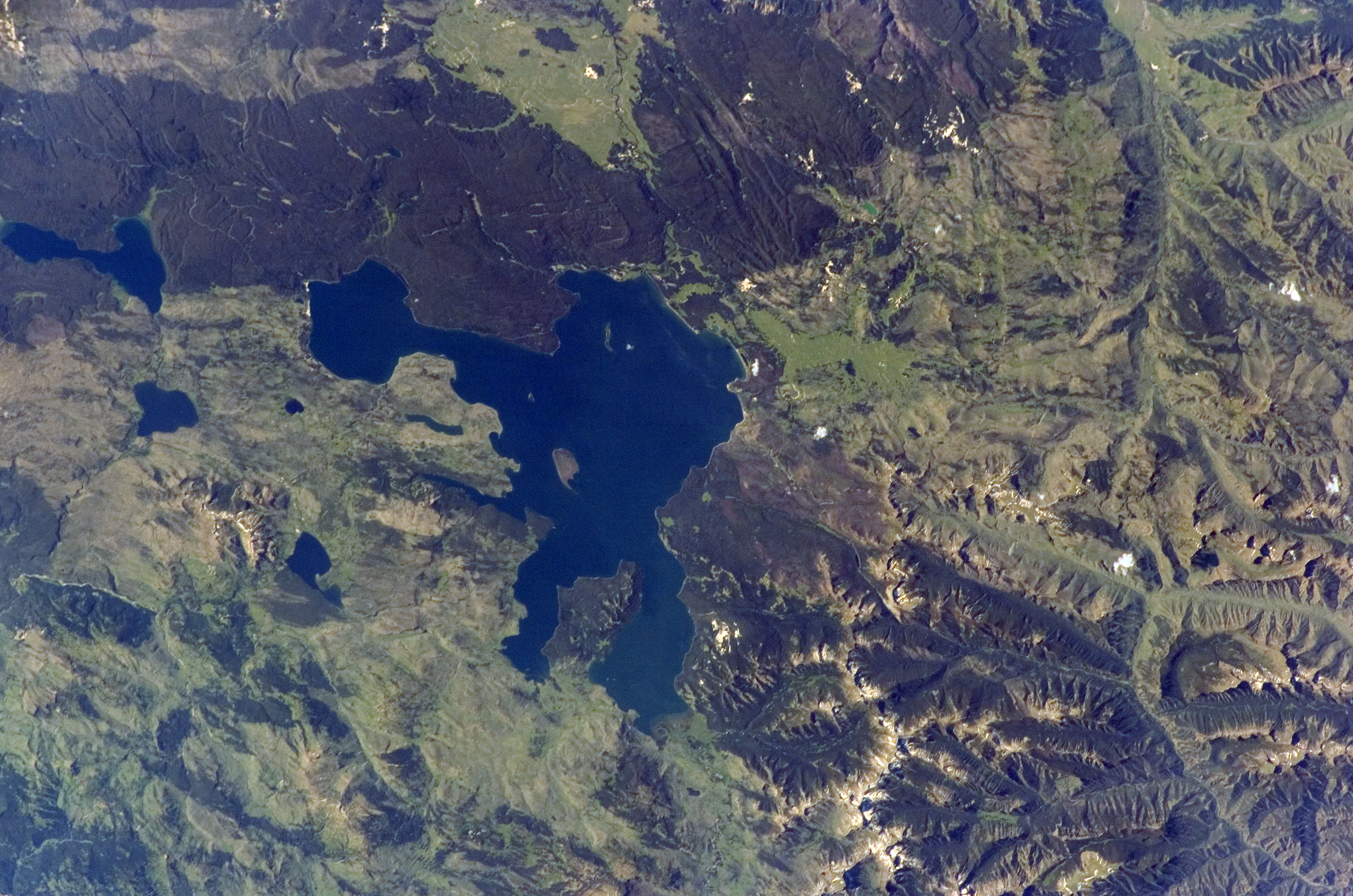
Yellowstone Lake contains several of Wyoming's islands, of which Frank Island is the largest.

The following is a list of islands of Wyoming. Occupying 97,814 square miles (253,348 km^{2}), the state of Wyoming is the 10th largest state in the country. It is the sixth largest state to not have an ocean coastline. Despite being landlocked, Wyoming does contain islands; the state contains 713.16 square miles (1,847 km^{2}) of water, which is 0.72% of the state's total area.

Wyoming has 35 named islands, in which the majority of those are located in Jackson Lake (Grand Teton National Park) and Yellowstone Lake (Yellowstone National Park) in the northwest portion of the state. The Green River and several other rivers contain numerous river islands.

Island	Body of water	County	Elevation	Coordinates
Arizona Island	Jackson Lake	Teton	6,811 feet (2,076 m)	43.96611°N 110.65278°W
Badger Island	Jackson Lake	Teton	6,775 feet (2,065 m)	43.87167°N 110.65167°W
Ball Island	Cottonwood Creek	Teton	7,064 feet (2,153 m)	42.71855°N 110.04766°W
Big Island	Green River	Sweetwater	6,211 feet (1,893 m)	41.75357°N 109.72597°W
Boulder Island	Leigh Lake	Teton	6,919 feet (2,109 m)	43.80000°N 110.72694°W
Bush Island	Wind River	Fremont	7,519 feet (2,292 m)	43.48889°N 109.57167°W
Carrington Island	Yellowstone Lake	Teton	7,736 feet (2,358 m)	44.45639°N 110.55472°W
Cow Island	Jackson Lake	Teton	6,798 feet (2,072 m)	43.93194°N 110.64500°W
Dollar Island	Jackson Lake	Teton	6,814 feet (2,077 m)	43.86972°N 110.66389°W
Donoho Point	Jackson Lake	Teton	6,886 feet (2,099 m)	43.84639°N 110.62917°W
Dot Island	Yellowstone Lake	Teton	7,746 feet (2,361 m)	44.45194°N 110.40972°W
Elk Island	Jackson Lake	Teton	6,873 feet (2,095 m)	43.86139°N 110.67750°W
Ferry Island	Green River	Sublette	6,745 feet (2,056 m)	42.52361°N 110.05583°W
Frank Island	Yellowstone Lake	Teton	7,795 feet (2,376 m)	44.42528°N 110.36778°W
Freezeout Island	Green River	Sweetwater	6,253 feet (1,906 m)	41.84333°N 109.78861°W
Grassy Island	Jackson Lake	Teton	6,791 feet (2,070 m)	43.85917°N 110.73167°W
Indian Island	Jackson Lake	Teton	6,778 feet (2,066 m)	43.96111°N 110.65917°W
Johnson Island	North Platte River	Carbon	6,640 feet (2,020 m)	41.57333°N 106.96778°W
Long Island	Green River	Sublette	6,650 feet (2,030 m)	42.38611°N 110.11583°W
Mack Island	New Fork River	Sublette	6,870 feet (2,090 m)	42.64717°N 109.83959°W
Marie Island	Jackson Lake	Teton	6,772 feet (2,064 m)	43.84667°N 110.65528°W
Molly Islands	Yellowstone Lake	Teton	7,739 feet (2,359 m)	44.31361°N 110.26500°W
Moose Island	Jackson Lake	Teton	6,778 feet (2,066 m)	43.92500°N 110.65028°W
Mullison Island	North Platte River	Carbon	6,778 feet (2,066 m)	41.46583°N 106.80806°W
Mystic Isle	Leigh Lake	Teton	6,919 feet (2,109 m)	43.81972°N 110.72440°W
Oxbow Bend	Snake River	Teton	6,735 feet (2,053 m)	43.86278°N 110.54806°W
Peale Island	Yellowstone Lake	Teton	7,743 feet (2,360 m)	44.28806°N 110.31639°W
Pelican Roost	Yellowstone Lake	Teton	7,736 feet (2,358 m)	44.52222°N 110.30556°W
Sheffield Island	Jackson Lake	Teton	6,804 feet (2,074 m)	43.87694°N 110.65500°W
Stevenson Island	Yellowstone Lake	Teton	7,762 feet (2,366 m)	44.51528°N 110.38444°W
Tarters Island	Green River	Sublette	6,709 feet (2,045 m)	42.48389°N 110.07667°W
Telephone Island	Green River	Sweetwater	6,227 feet (1,898 m)	41.78667°N 109.76694°W
Treasure Island	Bechler River	Teton	6,713 feet (2,046 m)	44.24306°N 110.94000°W
Willow Island	Green River	Sublette	7,254 feet (2,211 m)	42.88639°N 109.85472°W
