= Bureau of American Ethnology =

American research organization

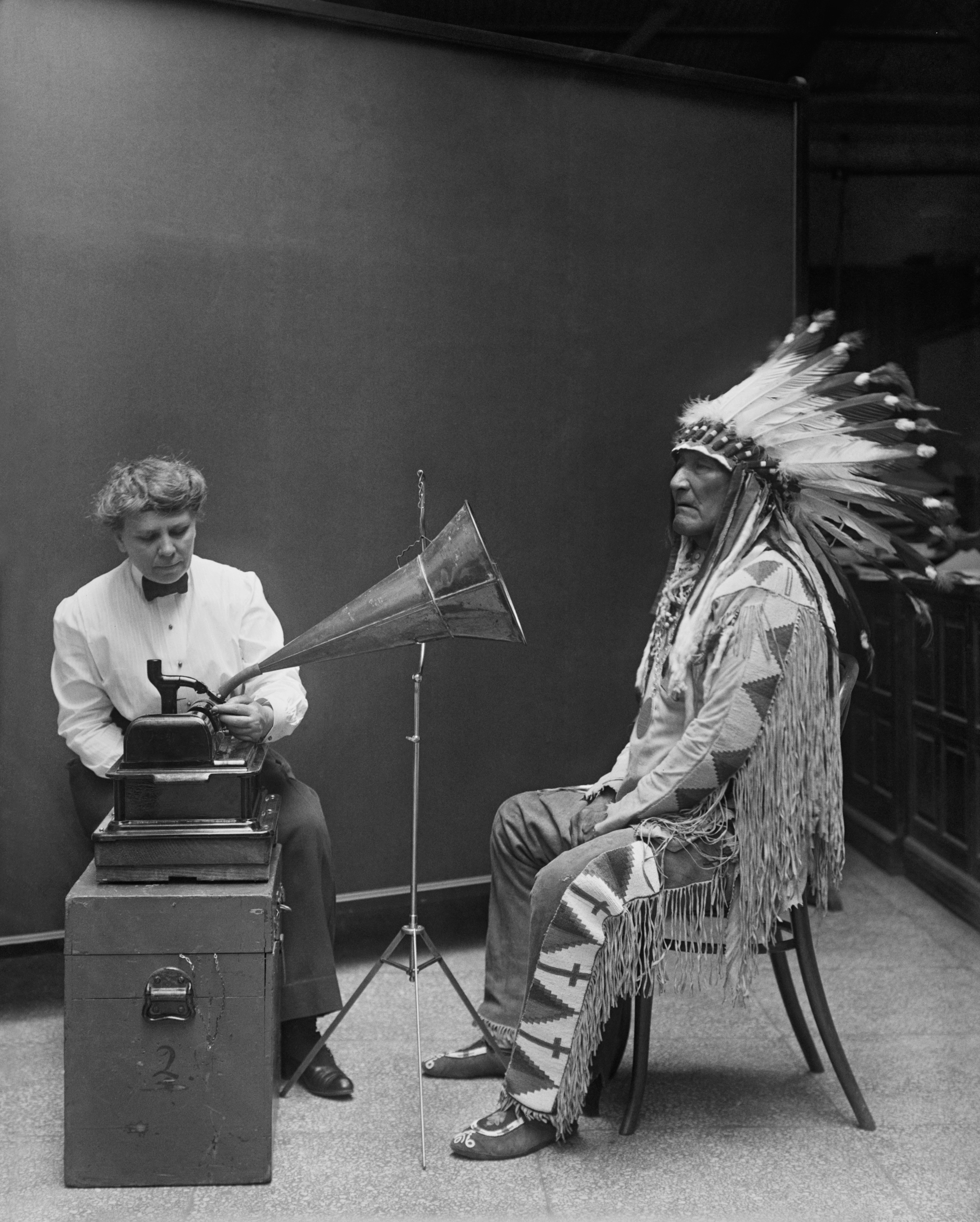
Frances Densmore with Blackfoot chief Mountain Chief during a recording session for the BAE

The Bureau of American Ethnology (or BAE, originally, Bureau of Ethnology) was established in 1879 by an act of Congress for the purpose of transferring archives, records and materials relating to the Indians of North America from the Department of the Interior to the Smithsonian Institution. But from the start, the bureau's visionary founding director, John Wesley Powell, promoted a broader mission: "to organize anthropologic research in America." Under Powell, the bureau organized research-intensive multi-year projects; sponsored ethnographic, archaeological and linguistic field research; initiated publications series (most notably its Annual Reports and Bulletins); and promoted the fledgling discipline of anthropology. It prepared exhibits for expositions and collected anthropological artifacts for the Smithsonian United States National Museum. In addition, the BAE was the official repository of documents concerning American Indians collected by the various US geological surveys, especially the Geographical and Geological Survey of the Rocky Mountain Region and the Geological Survey of the Territories. It developed a manuscript repository, library and illustrations section that included photographic work and the collection of photographs.

In 1897, the Bureau of Ethnology's name changed to the Bureau of American Ethnology (BAE) to emphasize the geographic limit of its interests, although its staff briefly conducted research in US possessions such as Hawaii and the Philippines. In 1965, the BAE merged with the Smithsonian's Department of Anthropology to form the Smithsonian Office of Anthropology within the United States National Museum (now the Department of Anthropology, National Museum of Natural History). In 1968, the SOA archives became the National Anthropological Archives.

== Research ==
The BAE's staff included some of America's earliest field anthropologists, including Frank Hamilton Cushing, James Owen Dorsey, Jesse Walter Fewkes, Alice Cunningham Fletcher, John N.B. Hewitt, Francis La Flesche, Cosmos and Victor Mindeleff, James Mooney, William Henry Holmes, Edward Palmer, James Stevenson, and Matilda Coxe Stevenson. In the 20th century, the BAE's staff included such anthropologists as John Peabody Harrington (a linguist who spent more than 40 years documenting endangered languages), Matthew Stirling, and William C. Sturtevant. The BAE supported the work of many non-Smithsonian researchers (known as collaborators), most notably Franz Boas, Frances Densmore, Garrick Mallery, Washington Matthews, Paul Radin, Cyrus Thomas, and T.T. Waterman.

The BAE had three subunits: the Mound Survey (1882–1895); the Institute of Social Anthropology (1943–1952), and the River Basin Surveys (1946–1969).

=== Mound Survey ===
At the time the BAE was founded, there was intense controversy over the identity of the Mound Builders, the term for the prehistoric people who had built complex, monumental earthwork mounds. Archaeologists, both amateur and professional, were divided between believing the mounds were built by passing groups of people who settled in various places elsewhere, or believing they could have been built by Native Americans. Cyrus Thomas, the Bureau's appointed head of the Division of Mound Exploration, eventually published his conclusions on the origins of the mounds in the Bureau's Annual Report of 1894. It is considered to be the last word in the controversy over the Mound builders' identities. After Thomas' publication, scholars generally accepted that varying cultures of prehistoric indigenous peoples, Native Americans, were the Mound builders.

== See also ==
- History of Indigenous peoples of North America
- Native American history
- Moon-eyed people
- National Anthropological Archives
