= Matilda Coxe Stevenson =

American anthropologist (1849–1915)

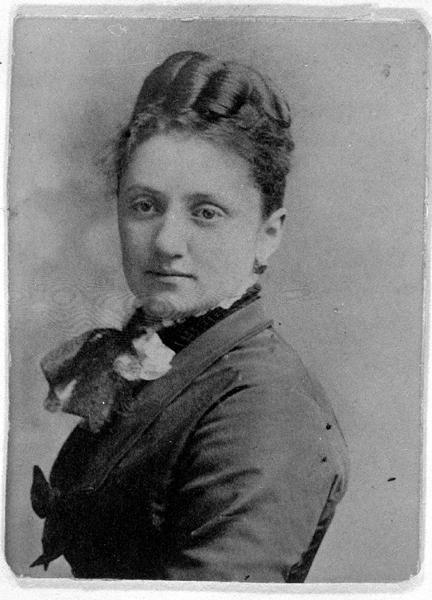
- circa 1870
- Born: Matilda Coxe Evans; May 12, 1849; San Augustine, Texas, US
- Died: June 24, 1915 (aged 66); Oxon Hill, Maryland, US
- Education: Miss Annable's Academy; private study of law with her father, Alexander H. Evans; of chemistry and geology with Dr. N. M. Mew of the Army Medical School, Washington, D.C.; of ethnology with her husband, James Stevenson, of the USGS
- Spouse: James D. Stevenson (m. 1872)
- Scientific career
- Fields: Ethnologist
- Workplaces: Bureau of American Ethnology, Smithsonian Institution

Matilda Coxe Stevenson (née Evans) (May 12, 1849 – June 24, 1915), who also wrote under the name Tilly E. Stevenson, was an American anthropologist. She was the first woman ever employed as an anthropologist in the U.S. She was also the first female anthropologist to study the Native Americans of New Mexico. She pioneered the use of photography in ethnology.

Stevenson was also a ethnologist, geologist, explorer, and activist, being a fervent supporter of women in science. She helped to establish the Women's Anthropological Society in Washington DC.

The first woman hired by the Bureau of American Ethnology (BAE) to research southwestern Indigenous people, she published multiple monographs and one long text on the Zuni people. Her work was supported by some of her male colleagues at the time and was seen as a contemporary by some of her fellow ethnologists or anthropologists. However, she faced barriers as a woman scientist in the nineteenth and early twentieth centuries; in order to compete, she defied societal expectation which pushed some to regard her as stubborn and aggressive.

== Early life and education ==
Matilda Coxe Evans was born in San Augustine, Texas, the third child out of four to Maria Matilda Coxe Evans from New Jersey and Alexander Hamilton Evans from Virginia. Her parents moved from Washington D.C. to newly annexed Texas sometime between 1846 and 1847. The family then moved between Texas, Washington D.C., and Pennsylvania throughout Matilda's early years.

Her education varied given the gender expectations and restrictions for middle-class white women at the time. Her formal education most likely began with governesses from private schools, then transitioned to academies and seminaries for women where the goal was to prepare their students to become wives and mothers. However, Coxe Evans also studied science, mathematics, history, geography, and other subjects because of the developed curriculum in Philadelphia schools. She attended Miss Anabel's English, French, and German School, originally located at 1350 Pine Street in Philadelphia.

When she returned to Washington, she continued her studies under her father (a lawyer) and William M. Mew, a chemist at the Army Medical Museum, since most colleges and universities were only open to men. Still, Coxe Evans desired to expand her opportunities beyond the household and hoped to become a mineralogist. Her plans altered when she met James Stevenson, a geologist and ethnologist with the US Geological Survey of the Territories.

== Early career ==
Evans married James Stevenson on April 18, 1872 before he left for an expedition under Ferdinand V. Hayden to conduct geological surveys in Colorado, Idaho, Wyoming, and Utah. Matilda Stevenson's marriage to James changed her life; he encouraged her to be bold and adventurous, never stopping or stalling her progress as a scientist. In 1878 Matilda Stevenson first encountered the techniques to perform an ethnographic study when she and her husband studied the Ute and Arapaho people. Stevenson, however, mostly taught herself how to conduct ethnographic studies and she would later forge off on her own.

By 1879, the US government created the Bureau of American Ethnology (BAE); Matilda Stevenson was appointed "volunteer coadjutor [sic] in ethnology." The BAE under John Wesley Powell promoted the view that the native peoples in America were disappearing. He urged American scientists to study the Native people. This view was the one that Matilda Stevenson would continue espousing for the remainder of her career. She went with James on his BAE expeditions to the Southwest, serving as his official assistant, and working with the Zuni people and Hopi among others. In this assistantship, there would be no pay for Stevenson.

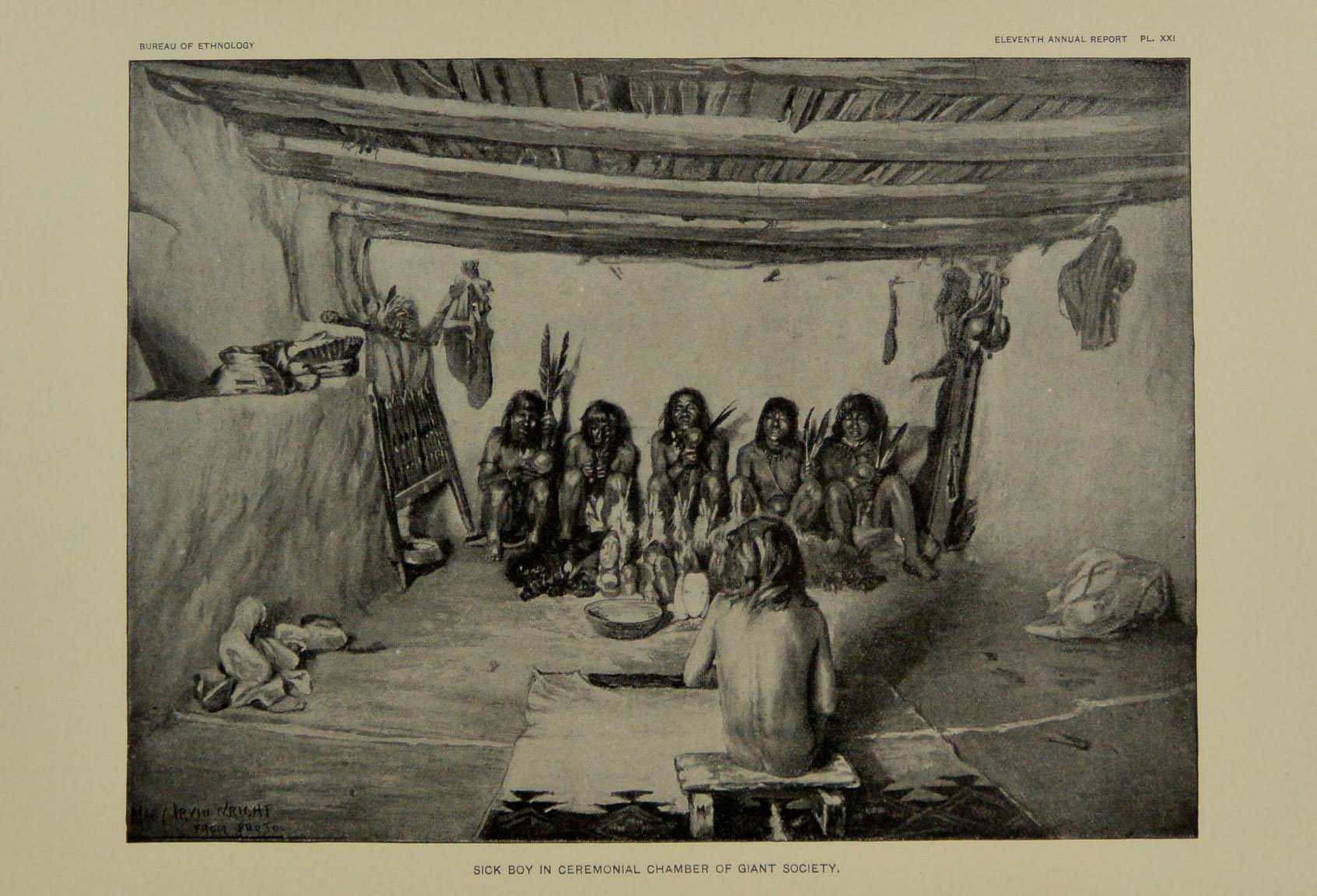
Sick Boy in Ceremonial Chamber of Giant Society from Matilda Coxe Stevenson's the Sia

She spent 13 years in explorations of the Rocky Mountain region with her husband. In the 1880s, the Stevensons' "formed the first husband-wife team in anthropology." During this series of BAE sanctioned expeditions Stevenson would encounter the people she would write the most about, Zuni.

Matilda Stevenson's contributions often focused on women and family life, for which she "quickly developed a reputation as a vigorous and devoted scientist." However, she did not limit herself solely to women and children. While the particular essay The Religious Life of the Zuni Child concerns itself with a boys' initiation rite in a specific Zuni ceremony, she did not limit herself to women, family life, nor children; what she did was bring Zuni children into anthropology and made them matter. Matilda Stevenson was able to do anthropological work because her work on women and children was considered appropriate for a woman at the time; however, it allowed her work to extend beyond family life to a diverse set of topics.

It was during this time that Stevenson developed her skills as an ethnographer. One of Stevenson's greatest skills was data collection; she did not rely on a single source, standard practice at the BAE. In keeping with John Wesley Powell's adage of the disappearing native, she and her colleagues sought to preserve Zuni and other indigenous cultures before they disappeared. However, what is ironic is that, while the various visitors to the Zuni wanted to preserve the life of the Zuni people, by entering the space, they were affecting and changing the Zuni world. In particular, by conversing with the Zuni people in English, encouraging them to buy and use manufactured items, and providing access to government schools for children, the visitors, including Stevenson and her husband, were altering Zuni life. It was the clash of the mindset of the ethnographer and the couples' Victorian sensibilities. Stevenson, herself, believed that white people, particularly women, had a responsibility to make the Indigenous peoples of America more civilized.

Matilda's reputation cemented itself during these years as well. She was often considered pushy and downright forceful. Her need to be an ethnologist and get to the exact truth, and her personality in the context of her time, made others see her as rude or arrogant. She would push herself into sacred religious ceremonies or continually push for access towards sacred spaces. This was the attitude that male ethnologists and anthropologists had at the time. In particular, with the BAE's attitude of saving the indigenous people's culture, it is no surprise that such attitudes were prevalent. Over the years at the Zuni pueblo, Stevensons, Frank Cushing, and Stewart Culin collected an overabundance artifacts from the Zuni people, including ceremonial objects (sometimes stolen), pottery, cookware, medicine, and clothes. During these expeditions with her husband, in 1881 Matilda Stevenson met her life long Zuni friend, We'wha, a lhamana. We'wha would be instrumental in helping to facilitate interactions between Matilda and the Zuni until We'wha's death.

In 1885, Stevenson helped to found the Women's Anthropological Society of America (WASA) in Washington DC. Her fellow members elected her as the first President of the Women's Anthropological Society of America. Although many of the WASA members were not active scientists, in the beginning many of them were the wives of senators and other politicians at the time. However, later many other women important to the fields of science joined WASA, including Anita Newcomb McGee and Maria Mitchell.

The WASA held importance to many of these women, as men had various professional organizations; however, women were mostly barred from entry. This barring meant "a membership in an organization of like-minded women reinforced their identity as professionals and serious scholars." It was during this time that Stevenson invited We'wha to come to Washington. We'wha was the perfect house guest for Stevenson as We'wha's presence increased in native studies, and could help fund future expeditions and interest in WASA. The visitation of We'wha raised opinions of both the Stevensons' as important people in Washington DC. In June 1886, Matilda Stevenson and We'wha met with President Cleveland and his wife, at the Stevenson's request, even going as far as President Cleveland and Stevenson having a conversation concerning the importance of ethnology.

== Later professional career ==
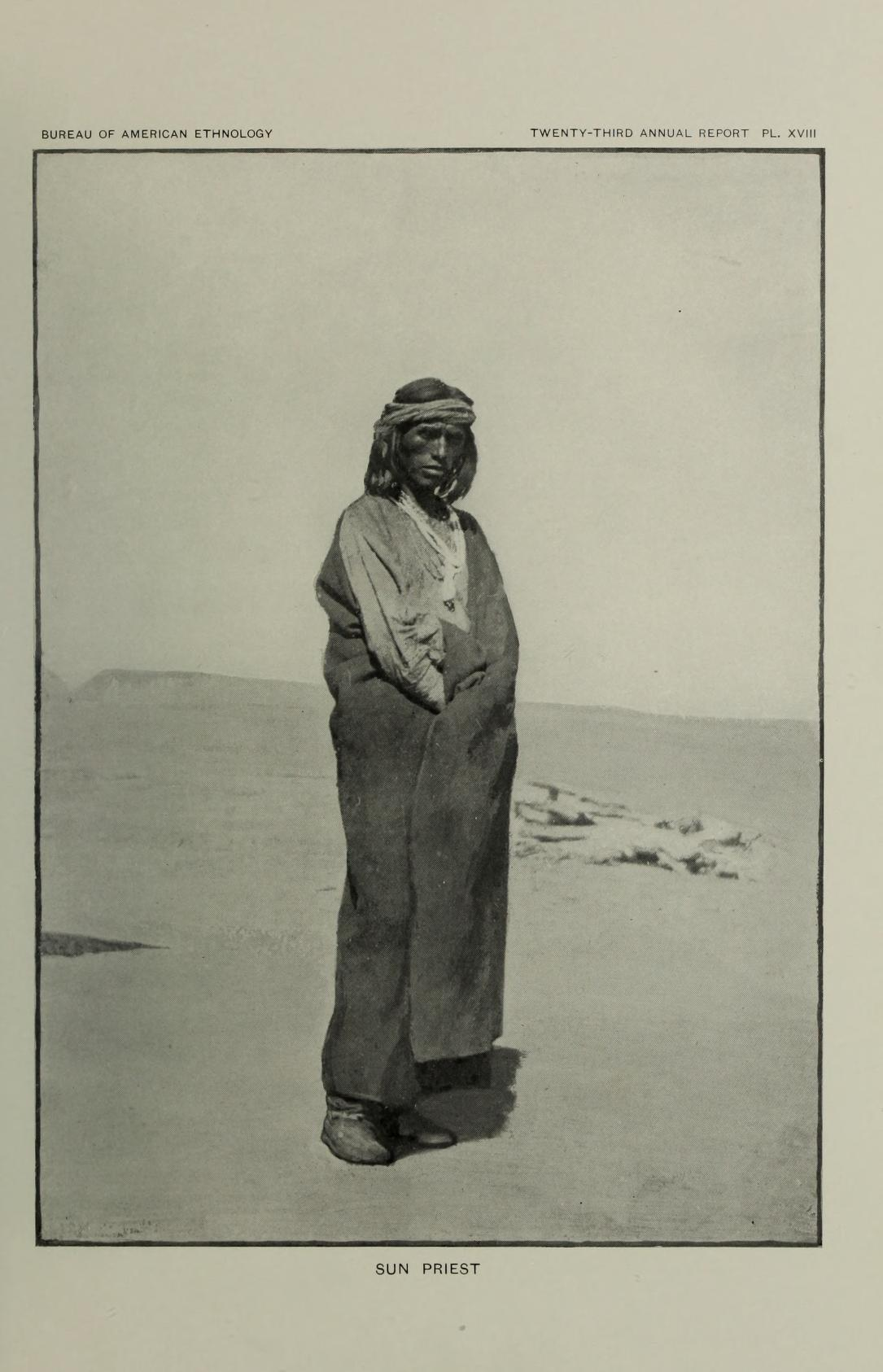
Photograph of Zuñi Sun Priest taken with camera circa 1890s from The Zuni Indians: Their Mythology Esoteric Fraternities and Ceremonies

After 16 years of a collaborative marriage, Matilda Stevenson lost her husband to Rocky Mountain fever. James Stevenson died on July 25, 1888. She was adamant that she would continue her husband's work and the work that she had started. In 1890 John Wesley Powell hired Stevenson as an assistant ethnologist, the first woman employed by Bureau of American Ethnology of the Smithsonian Institution, initially to organize his notes and later taking on a bigger role and leading her own research. However, such an undertaking would not be possible for a woman alone, so Powell assigned Stevenson an assistant, May S. Clark, who held this post until Stevenson's death. She took many of the photographs that filled Stevenson's masterwork, The Zuñi Indians: Their Mythology, Esoteric Fraternities, and Ceremonies (1904).

Powell promoted the usage of the camera as a tool for affixing permanent aspects of ethnology. The photographs facilitated Stevenson’s wish to capture forever the Zuni and other indigenous groups. However, as she and her husband had done in the past, her photography was an intrusive act interrupting ceremonies. Stevenson continued to work and research the indigenous peoples of the Southwest US.

Stevenson still had many barriers to her career; although she was paid to work for the BAE, it was less than men. Things began to change in the 1890s, as more women began to be allowed into professional societies, something that had not been possible for her earlier in her career. Stevenson was invited to join the Anthropological Society of Washington (ASW) in 1891 and the American Association for the Advancement of Science in 1892. In 1893, the Chicago's World Fair had expositions on native peoples of America. Stevenson served "as one of the judges of awards for the exposition's Department of American Ethnology" and delivered some speeches in the Women's Building. In 1896 Stevenson returned to the Zuni people to continue work on her manuscript.

Between 1897 and 1902, Stevenson suffered bouts of ill health; she sent Powell a letter stating her intention to study various other tribes. Her intentions did not change the fact that she failed to complete the draft of her project The Zuñi Indians: Their Mythology, Esoteric Fraternities, and Ceremonies (1904). It was supposed to be completed in 1897 but that deadline had passed.

John Powell became frustrated with the lack of progress by Stevenson on her book. It was under advisement by Powell, that he furloughed Stevenson. There are many opinions on the reasoning for Steveson's furlough; some authors believe that Powell wanted to rid the BAE "of staff members slow to publish." At the same time, some others state that "trying to eliminate successful women from government and laboratory staff by using the excuse of furlough for ill health was common practice at the time." Others consider Powell's difficulty, and desire, to remove Stevenson was because she was a respected professional and not an amateur.

Regardless, it became a fight between Stevenson and Powell. Stevenson used her connections in Washington to fight for her job, and this period of her life, at 53, was one of her most challenging.

In 1904, she finally produced her manuscript and was able to continue studying the various tribes. From 1890 to 1907, Stevenson did substantial individual fieldwork exploring the cave, cliff, and mesa ruins of the Zuni who resided in the Zuni River Valley in western New Mexico. She then studied all the rest of the Pueblo tribes of that state. From 1904 to 1910, she embarked on a special comparative study of the Zia, Jemez, San Juan, Cochiti, Nambe, Picarus, Tesuque, Santa Clara, San Ildefonso, Taos, and Tewa Native Americans.

During that time, in 1907, Matilda Stevenson purchased a ranch (Ton'yo) near San Ildefonso, which became her base for fieldwork. She continued to notice the changes in the pueblo peoples and "in 1911, she expressed in a letter to [Frederick Webb] Hodge, 'The more I study the Pueblos the vaster the field becomes, and the gradual changing of these people render[s] it of vast importance for students to work continuously while it [sic.] is yet time, for the younger generation perform their rituals with but slight understanding of the ancient beliefs of their people."

Just short of her retirement date at age 66, Stevenson died of heart troubles on June 24, 1915, in Maryland, where she'd gone to live with friends. Her obituary in the Evening Star described her as "Mrs. Matilda Coxe Stevenson, an authority on the Zuni and kindred tribes of the Pueblo Indians of New Mexico and Arizona, who was to have retired from her position in the Bureau of Ethnology in the Smithsonian Institution June 30th, after twenty-six years of service."

She was buried in Rock Tree Cemetery in Maryland, alongside her husband and his parents. Although she described herself as "poor as a church mouse," her work was acclaimed and her will lists such enviable possessions "as property in New Mexico and a ranch in Espanola Valley."

== Legacy ==
Artifacts collected by Matilda and James Stevenson are in the collections of the Department of Anthropology in the National Museum of Natural History of the Smithsonian Institution. Papers from Stevenson are in the Institution's National Anthropological Archives.

Among Stevenson's protégés was John Peabody Harrington

== Works ==
Stevenson was the author of:

- Zuñi and the Zuñians (1881)
- The Religious Life of the Zuñi Child (1888)
- The Sia, Zuñi Scalp Ceremonials (1890) (link is an excerpt)
- The Sia (1894)
- Zuñi Ancestral Gods and Masks (1898)
- Ethnobotany of the Zuñi Indians
- The Zuñi Indians: Their Mythology, Esoteric Fraternities, and Ceremonies (1904)

== Sources ==
- Parezo, Nancy J. (1989). "Matilda Coxe Evans Stevenson". In Gacs, Ute; Khan, Aisha; McIntyre, Jerrie; Weinberg, Ruth (eds.). Women Anthropologists: Selected Biographies (Illini Books edition, Reprint of Westport, CT: Greenwood Press original, 1988. ed.). Urbana: University of Illinois Press. pp. 337–343. ISBN 978-0-252-06084-7. OCLC 19670310.
