= We'wha =

Zuni lhamana and cultural ambassador (c. 1849–1896)

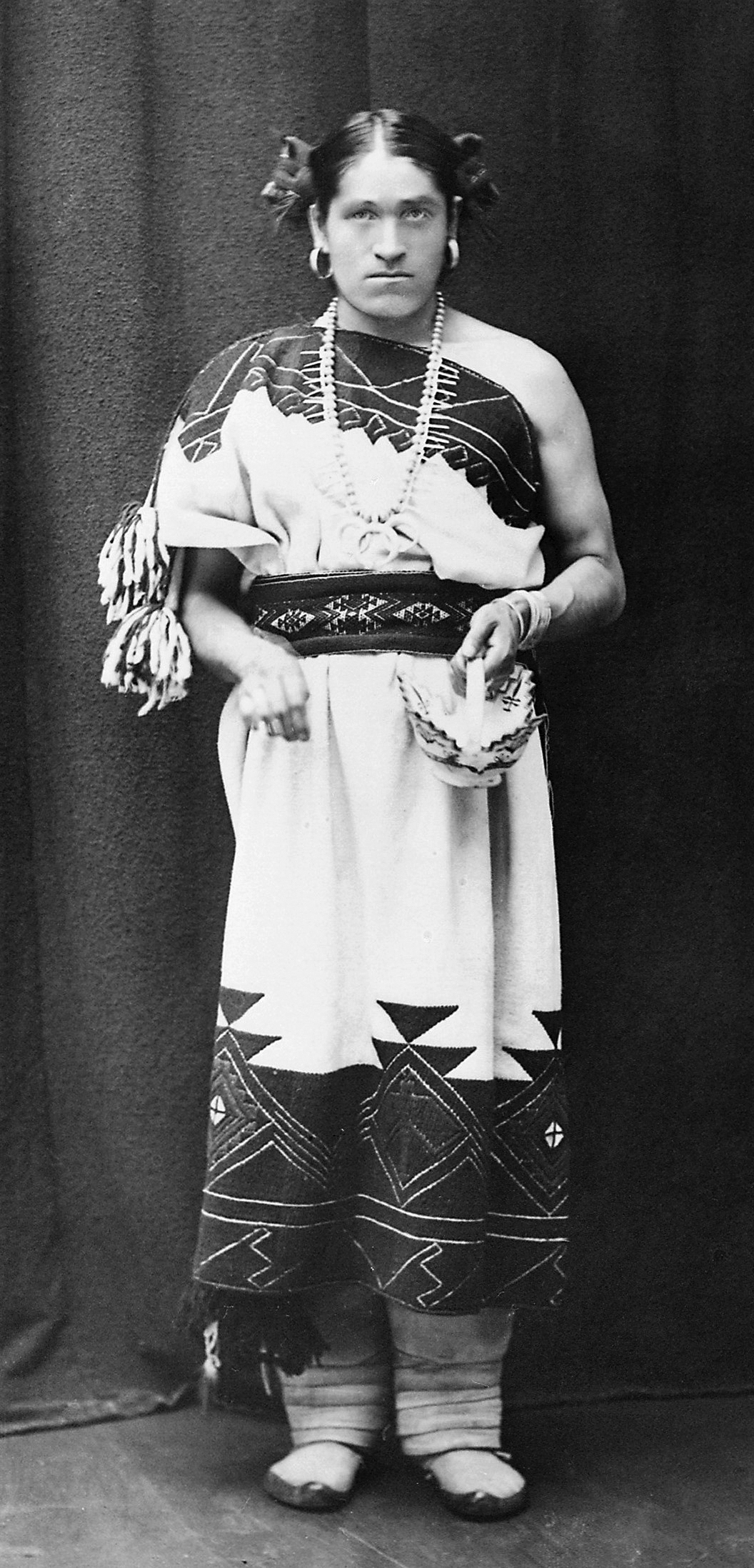
- We'wha, a Zuni lhamana, circa 1886
- Born: c. 1849; New Mexico, U.S.
- Died: 1896 (aged 46–47)

We'wha (c. 1849–1896, various spellings) was a Zuni Native American lhamana from New Mexico, and a notable weaver and potter. As the most famous lhamana on record, We'wha served as a cultural ambassador for Native Americans in general, and the Zuni in particular, serving as a contact point and educator for many European-American settlers, teachers, soldiers, missionaries, and anthropologists. We'wha's adopted family was one of the richest and most influential in Zuni culture, placing We'wha in a privileged position to assert their ceremonial importance as a lhamana. In 1886, We'wha was part of the Zuni delegation to Washington, D.C.; during that visit, We'wha met President Grover Cleveland.

In traditional Zuni culture, the lhamana are male-bodied people who take on the social and ceremonial roles usually performed by women in their culture, at least some of the time. Markedly, We'wha still participated in male Zuni social roles. For instance, We'wha belonged to the male kachina society, a group who performed ritual dances in ceremonial masks. lhamana wear a mixture of women's and men's clothing. Some contemporary lhamana participate in the modern, pan-Native American two-spirit community.

We'wha's friendship with anthropologist Matilda Coxe Stevenson would lead to much material on the Zuni being published. Stevenson wrote down her observations of We'wha, using both male and female pronouns at different points in time, writing, "She performs masculine religious and judicial functions at the same time that she performs feminine duties, tending to laundry and the garden". "He was the most intelligent person in the pueblo. Strong character made his word law among both men and women with whom he associated. Though his wrath was dreaded by men as well as women, he was loved by all children, to whom he was ever kind." We'wha lived for part of his life in the role and dress usually associated with men in Zuni culture, and part of her life in roles associated with women, then again in roles and dress associated with men. Friends and relatives have used both male and female pronouns for We'wha, depending on stage of life and current occupation.

== Early life ==
We'wha was born around 1849 in New Mexico as a member of the Zuni people. The Zuni tribe at this time was still free to practice their religious customs and ceremonies. The year of We'wha's birth was the first year the Zuni had interactions with the Americans, and they initially agreed to ally with the colonists in some territorial battles against their traditional rivals the Navajo and Apache. The colonists brought smallpox to the village and in 1853 both of We'wha's parents died from the new illness. We'wha and his brother were then adopted by their aunt on their father's side. We'wha remained a member of her mother's tribal clan known as the donashi:kwe (the Badger People). He also retained ceremonial ties to his father's clan, bichi:kwe (the Dogwood People). The new adoptive arrangement also added two foster sisters and a brother.

Zuni children could be recognized as lhamana, from as early as three or four. However, in We'wha's case, We'wha was first included in religious ceremonies for Zuni boys at the age of twelve. It was not until a few years after this that the tribe recognized We'wha's lhamana traits and his religious training was then handed over to female relatives. We'wha then learned the skills of the Zuni women – grinding and making corn meal, making ceremonial pottery, cooking, and various domestic tasks. In 1864, the Zunis and the American troops won a victory over the Navajo, and the Navajo were then sent out to a reservation in New Mexico for four years. Some members of We'wha's tribe then moved into the abandoned Zuni lands of Nutria and Pescado, and became farmers, including We'wha and his adoptive family. While We'wha's family lived in this region, We'wha worked as a farmer, which was considered a traditionally male occupation in Zuni culture.

== Adult life ==
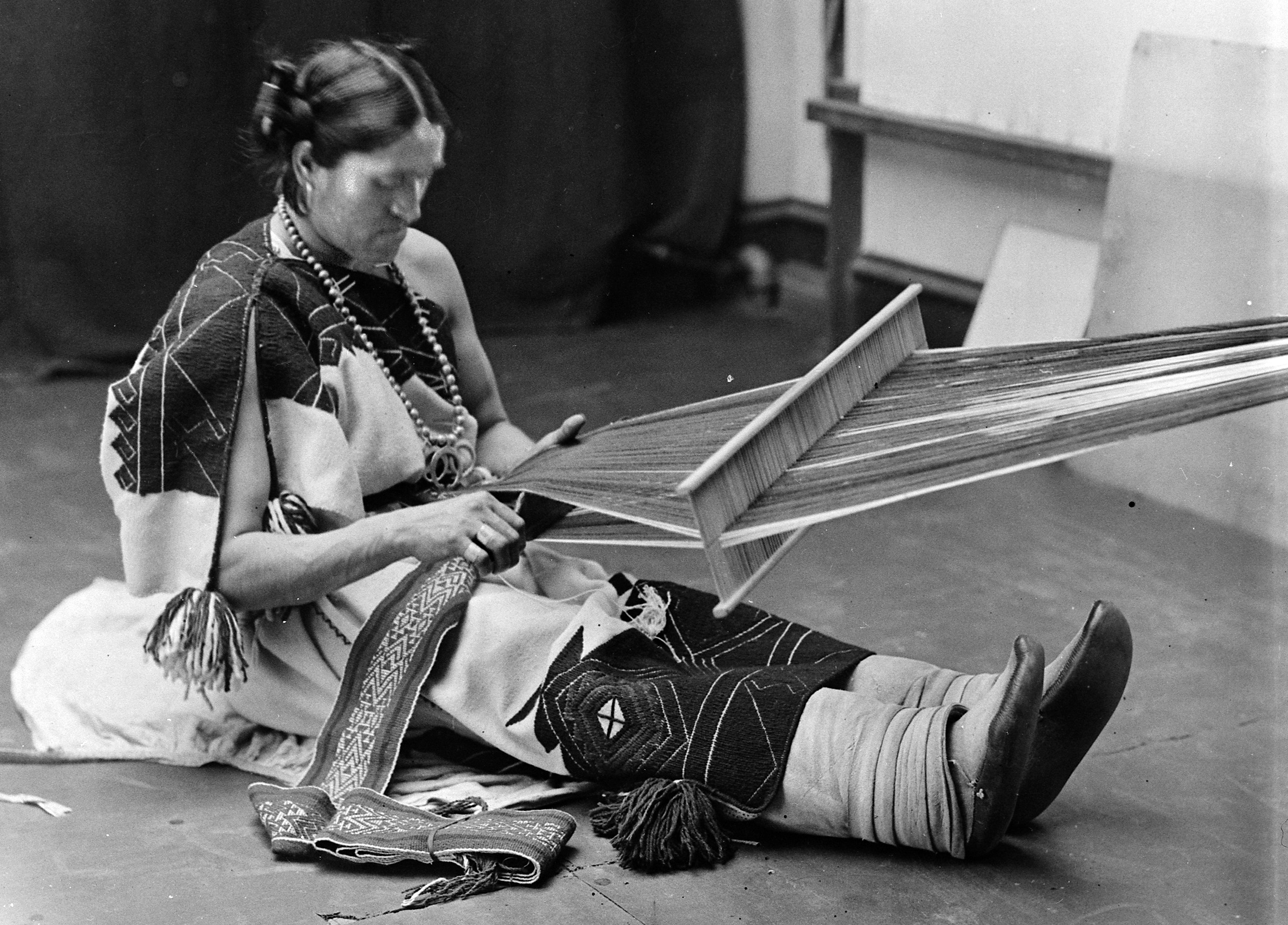
We'wha working at a backstrap loom

In the 1870s We'wha was still living and working on the farm. As We'wha's adoptive mother began to get older, We'wha took on more of the household duties, as did his adopted older sister. In 1877 Protestant missionaries began to arrive among the Zuni tribe. These missionaries were part of the "Peace Policy of Grant Administration". The policy was for Native Americans, instead of being moved onto reservations, to be assimilated into American society by indoctrination into Christianity and other colonial beliefs and social structures. These Protestant missionaries were the first white people to live among this particular Zuni tribe and were likely the first white people that We'wha had encountered. At this point, We'wha would have been in his thirties.

The Presbyterian minister and medical doctor assigned to We'wha's tribe was a man named Taylor F. Ealy, who arrived at the village with his wife, two daughters, and an assistant teacher on October 12, 1878. They were assigned to a school built there the year before. We'wha helped Mrs. Ealy care for her two small daughters, along with various teaching responsibilities and housework. Mrs. Ealy's diary included pages talking about We'wha: "We made in all this week five garments; a skirt and two basques for We-Wa [sic], a dress for Grace (a Zuni), a dress and skirt for her sister, besides one for which they found the calico." That diary entry is dated January 29, 1881, and at this point We'wha is wearing skirts and doing childcare, so likely being perceived in a female role in the community. It is possible We'wha received payment for her work with the Ealys. It would not have been in the form of currency, but rather goods similar to the clothes they made together. In 1881 the Protestant missionaries began to depart the village including the Ealy family. The mission had changed the religious mindset of the Zuni very little and the impact the school had was minimal. The school remained there but had little impact until it was revitalized in 1888.

== We'wha and Stevenson's friendship ==
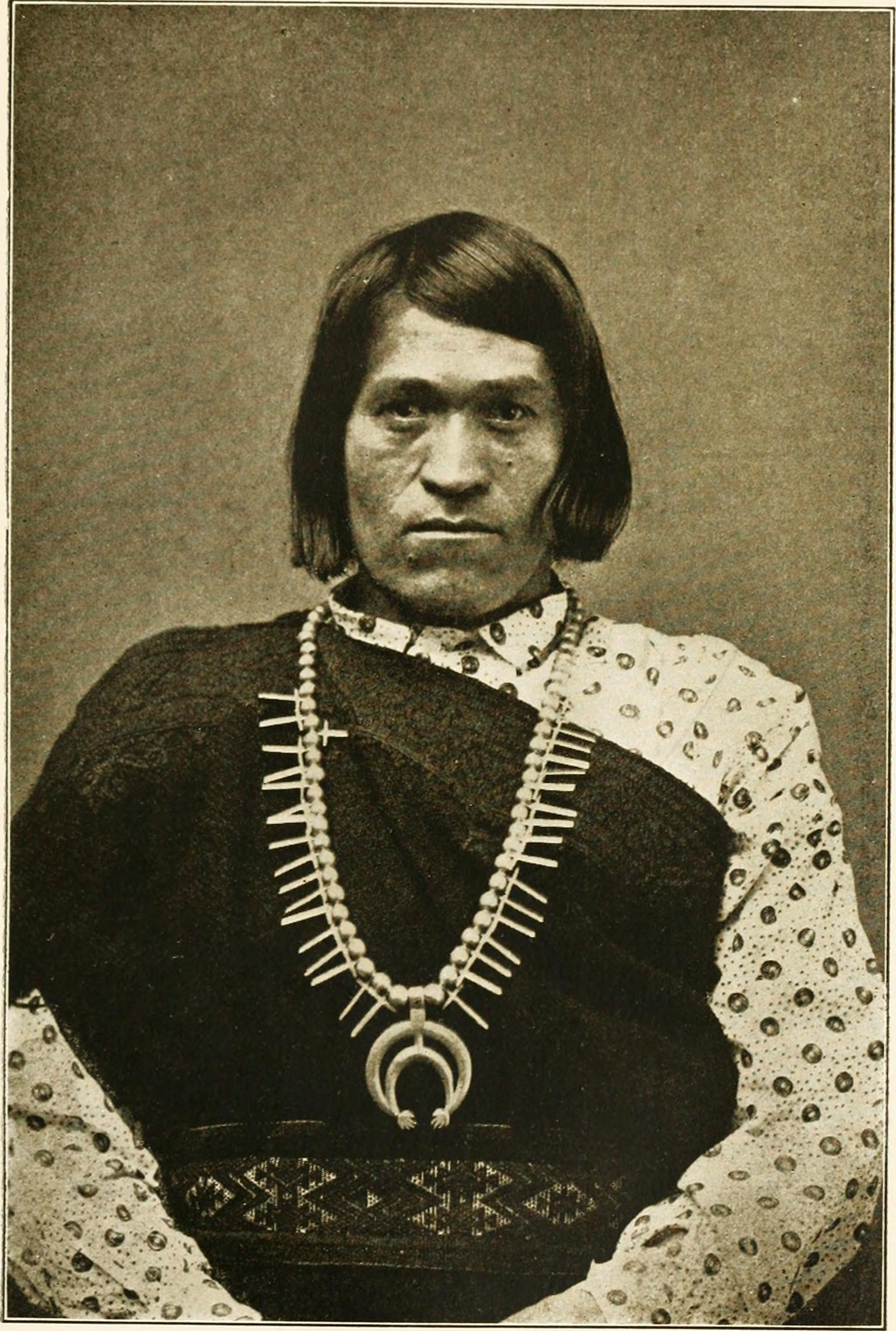
We'wha, undated photograph; acquired in New Mexico in 1920

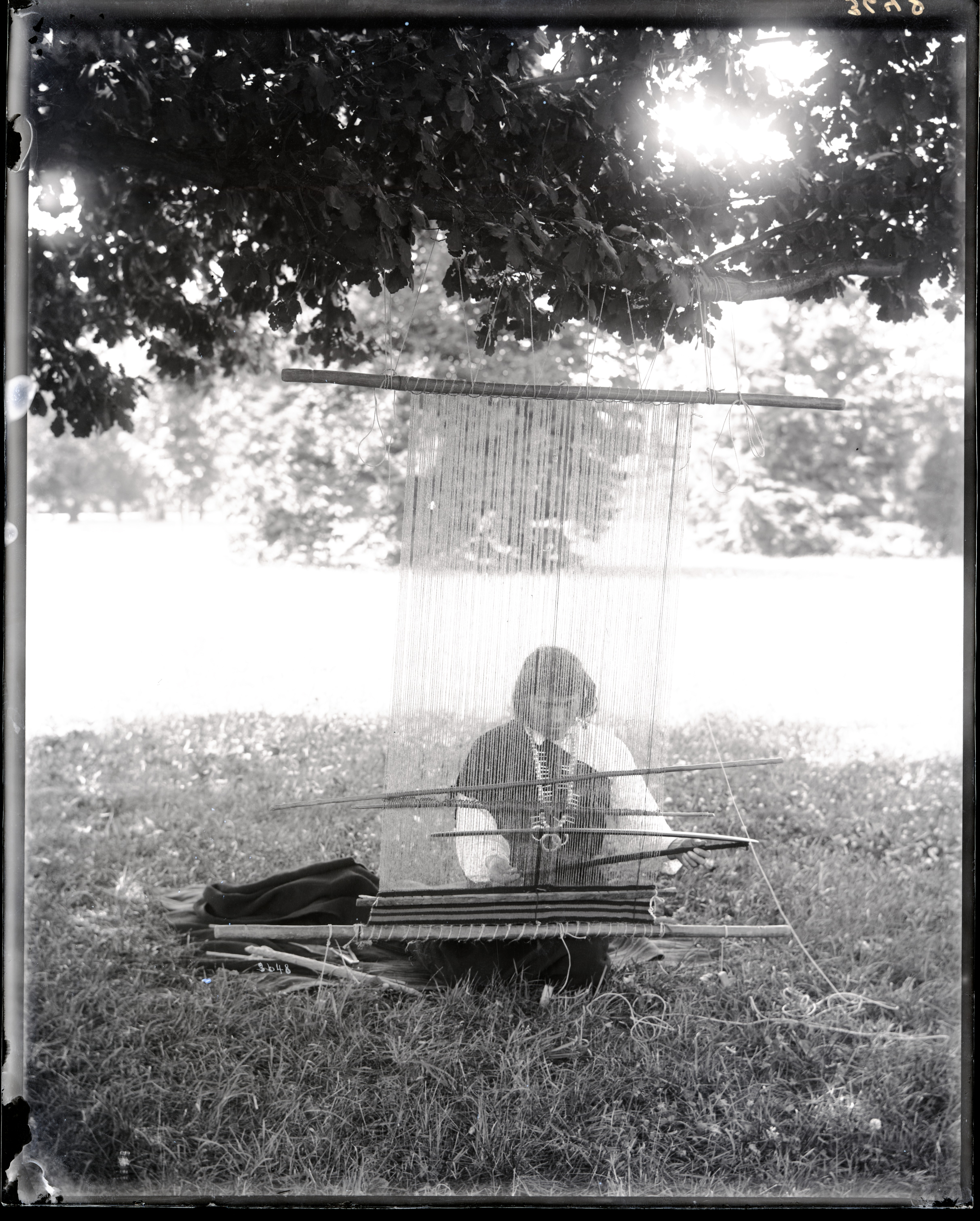
We'wha weaving at a blanket loom during a 1880s visit to Washington, D.C.

Matilda Coxe Stevenson and We'wha met each other in 1879, while they were working with Mrs. Ealy. Stevenson wrote that We'wha was very friendly to outsiders and willing to learn English. We'wha was described by Stevenson as "the most intelligent person in the pueblo. Strong character made his word law among both men and women with whom he associated. Though his wrath was dreaded by men as well as women, he was loved by all children, to whom he was ever kind". By learning English, We'wha was able to interact well with white visitors, and this helped them build a friendship with Stevenson. We'wha was visited by Stevenson in 1881, 1884, 1886, 1891–92, 1895 and 1896. These visits encouraged the cultivation of their friendship.

In 1879, Stevenson introduced commercial laundry soap to We'wha's village (Southwestern tribes already had herbal soaps). She taught them how to wash clothes using this stronger, chemical soap and soon We'wha began washing quantities of clothes for the members of the Protestant mission, earning silver dollars for this service. We'wha then decided to move to Fort Wingate and wash for the soldiers as well as the captain's family. We'wha began to extend the business past the fort, and wash for white settlers as well. Few Zuni people worked for white people for pay. If they did work for pay, "the men wearing female attire being preferred to the women on account of their strength and endurance".

Stevenson refers to her friend We'wha as "he" and at other times as "she", seeming to have made a choice for the latter sometime after 1904, writing in her diary, "As the writer could never think of her faithful and devoted friend in any other light, she will continue to use the feminine gender when referring to We'wha".

We'wha was hired by Stevenson to make Zuni religious pottery that would later be displayed in the National Museum in Washington, D.C. We'wha was a very accomplished potter, and followed the strict religious protocols that went with making Zuni pottery. As a talented weaver, We'wha also created baskets, dresses, blankets, and sashes. It was said that We'wha had an eye for likable patterns and colors. George Wharton James, an expert on Native American weaving styles wrote, "She was an expert weaver, and her pole of soft stuff was laden with the work of her loom-blankets and dresses exquisitely woven, and with a delicate perception of colour-values that delighted the eye of the connoisseur".

We'wha's friendship with Stevenson put We'wha at risk of being accused of witchcraft by the Zuni tribe. The Zuni regarded tribal members who passed on secrets to outsiders with suspicion. However, We'wha's tribe never accused them of witchcraft and continued to trust We'wha as a valued lhamana.

== We'wha's visit to Washington D.C. ==
In December 1885, Matilda Coxe Stevenson and her husband James Stevenson took We'wha to Washington, D.C. This was We'wha's first experience with an American city. She was a part of Washington society alongside the Stevensons during the trip and attended various events. These included activities for high society such as going to the New National Theater for a ball and participating in a tea party with Washington ladies. One of the more notable events was We'wha meeting President Grover Cleveland on June 24, 1886. She left Washington later that month.

We'wha drew special attention from the United States government and press. We'wha drew this attention because most Americans believed We'wha to be a woman, and it was unusual for the United States to receive female Native American delegates. Many other male Native American visitors in the nineteenth century visited the United States with hardly any attention from the public or the press. This attention is what allowed We'wha to meet with and shake the hand of US President Grover Cleveland.

We'wha had their own goals in their visit to the capital. They viewed themselves as a representative of the Zuni tribe and did their best to establish good relations with the United States government and its people to ensure the health of their ongoing alliance.

== Later life ==
After serving as a cultural ambassador for the Zuni population in Washington, We'wha returned to the pueblo community. But, six years after their time spent in Washington, We'wha served a month in prison. The reason We'wha spent time in prison has been questioned as some attribute it to witchcraft. Will Roscoe wrote that "he spent a month in jail for resisting soldiers sent by that same government to interfere in his community affairs." In this he is referencing the Government We'wha worked with while visiting Washington. Will Roscoe additionally writes on another occasion clarifying the misinterpretation of We'wha and the witchcraft allegation. He states:

We'wha and other Zuni leaders were never accused of witchcraft – rather a young man was so accused and tried by Zuni leaders, and We'wha, who resisted the soldiers sent to arrest those leaders, was themself arrested.

In 1896, We'wha's family was selected to host the annual Sha'lako festival and he worked to ensure everything was prepared. These preparations included "carefully laying the stone floor in the large room where the bird-god would dance." He died shortly after participating in the festival due to heart failure. After We'wha's death, Stevenson recalled the moment in one of her books:

It is the custom for a member of the family to hold the prayer plumes near the mouth of the dying and repeat the prayer, but this practice was not observed in We'wha's case. [...] The brother offered to hold the plumes and say the prayers, but We'wha feebly extended her hand for them, and clasping the prayer plumes between her hands made a great effort to speak. She said but a few words and then sank back in her chair. Again the brother offered to hold the plumes and pray, but once more she refused.

== Legacy ==
We'wha's legacy and actions throughout their life have led to We'wha being recognized as a notable person in history.

A modern-day representation of We'wha that exemplifies her importance is when We'wha appeared in a Google Doodle on November 1, 2021, which included some biographical and legacy details, along with a weaving game to help learn about Zuni weaving. The art of the interactive Google doodle was done by Mallery Quetawki, a Zuni individual. Through Mallery's response to a question, they explain that We'wha had a large role in representing Zuni Culture and the core element of art as a weaver.

"Personally, creating the We:wa Doodle was an honor as We:wa was such a warm and generous individual who exemplified our core values as A:shiwi. To be representing my people on this Doodle is another honor that I will always be thankful for. We are a village filled with talented artists and I am absolutely grateful for this honor to represent our history and to tell it using our art." (Zuni Pueblo guest artist Mallery Quetawki)

We'wha also has a page on The National Women's History Museum's website, published recently as June 2021. This page briefly covers We'wha's life and contributions to the world, describing We'wha as an individual who "left a profound legacy as a ceremonial leader, cultural ambassador, and artist who worked to preserve the Zuni way of life." In the late 2010s, San Francisco's Rainbow Honor Walk installed a bronze plaque honoring We'wha with the inscription:

"Respected Zuni lhamana or two spirit, accomplished potter, weaver and cultural ambassador of the Zuni nation."

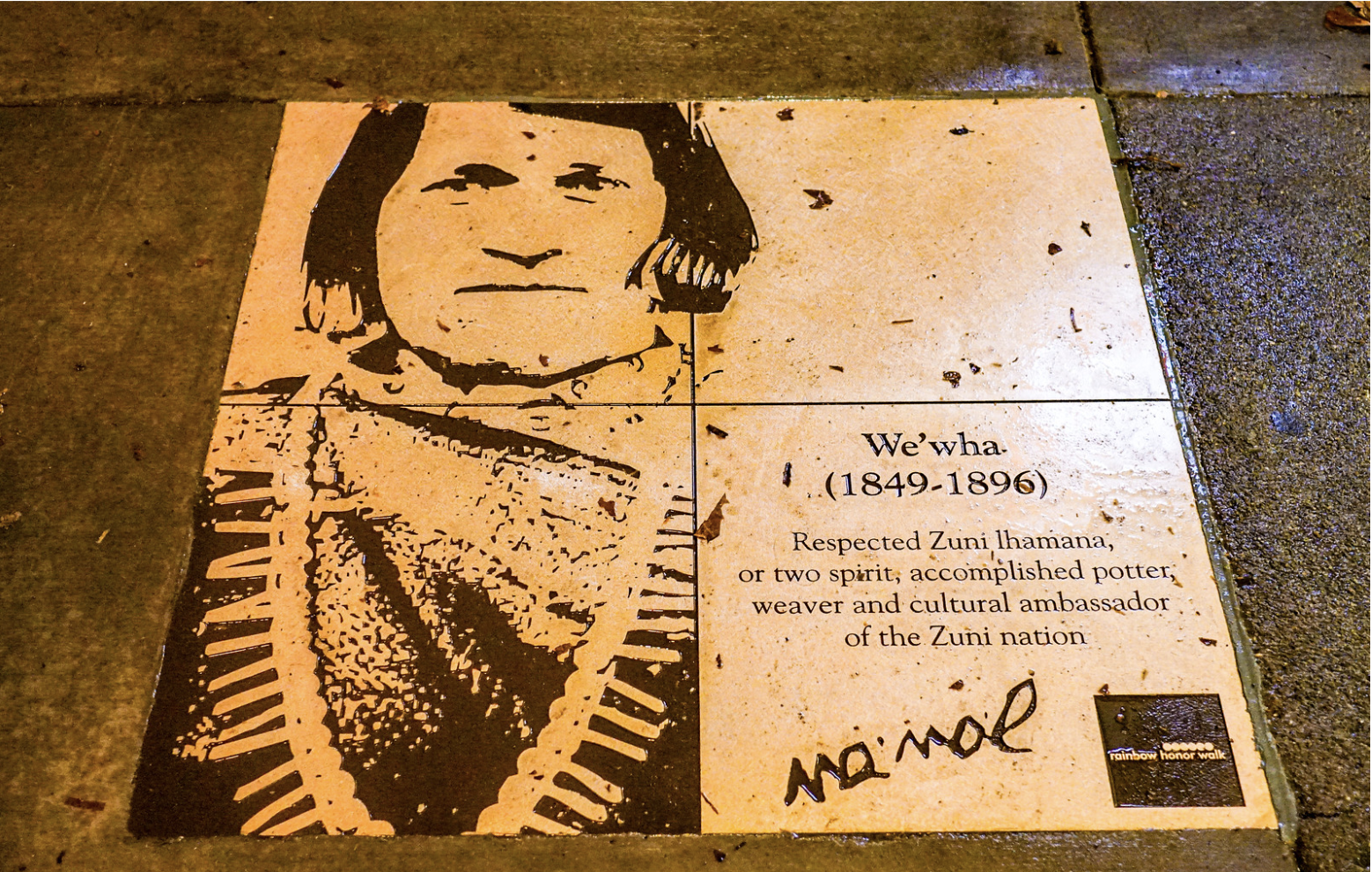
We'wha's plaque in San Francisco's Rainbow Honor Walk

As a skilled artist, We'wha was one of the first of the Zuni to produce Zuni art like pottery and textiles with the intent of selling their work, beginning a process that would see Native American art become a popular fine art sold in the United States and elsewhere. To further extend the Zuni tribe's cultural legacy, We'wha also presented US President Grover Cleveland and First Lady, Frances Cleveland, with a handcrafted wedding gift. Thanks in part to We'wha, the Zuni people's second largest source of income now comes from the selling of Zuni artwork.

Also, Paul Elliott Russell, an American writer and university professor ranked We'wha 53rd in his 1995 book The Gay 100: A Ranking of the Most Influential Gay Men and Lesbians, Past and Present on the Most Important Queer People in the World world history.

We'wha's legacy can be attributed to several spellings of their name as well as several nicknames. Some spellings and ways in which We'wha was referred to include: We'wha, We:wa, Zuni Princess, and many other titles.

== Pronouns ==
There is significant disagreement about what pronouns one should use in reference to We'wha. Matilda Coxe Stevenson, a contemporary of and close friend of We'wha, varied between masculine and feminine pronouns. Will Roscoe, the scholar who has written the most about We'wha, uses primarily masculine pronouns. The National Women's History Museum's page on We'wha opts to use the gender-neutral pronoun "they", arguing that the Zuni recognized lhamana as culturally and socially distinct from both men and women, so neither masculine nor feminine pronouns are appropriate. There is still no consensus.

Roscoe was thus sometimes criticized for having presented We'wha as a homosexual man, on the basis of a Eurocentric vision of homosexuality. However, the Zuni's ultimately still obscure definition of gender identity cannot be compared to Western definitions.

"What is important to emphasize is the fact that the berdache refers to a "distinct gender status, designated by special terms rather than the words ‘man' or ‘woman.'" Thus the designation of the berdache as simply homosexual, transvestite, and hermaphrodite is simply inappropriate as these terms connote the notion of either lack or excess which deviates from the normal. Even though native communities understand that gender is socially constructed, they view the third gender as a common part of their society." (Bayu Kristanto)

== See also ==
- List of people with non-binary gender identities
