= James Stevenson (geologist) =

American anthropologist (1840–1888)

Colonel James D. Stevenson (December 24, 1840 – July 25, 1888) was an executive officer of the U.S. Geological Survey and a self-taught ethnologist, anthropologist, geologist, and naturalist. His geological surveys included Colorado, Idaho, Wyoming and Utah. He collected extensively among the Zuni and Hopi, and also documented the Ute and Arapaho people.

== Early life and education ==
James Stevenson was born in Maysville, Kentucky. As a young man, he went on his first expedition to the Missouri River with Dr. Ferdinand Vandeveer Hayden, where he began documenting "Indian customs" and learning aspects of local languages. During the American Civil War, Stevenson enlisted as a private and became second-lieutenant of the Thirteenth New York Volunteers in the Union Army.

In 1866, he resumed working under Professor Hayden, acting as assistant to the Geological Survey. He was a close friend to General John A. Logan, who helped to advocate for the establishment of the United States Geological Survey and government support of a series of surveys under Hayden's leadership, including the Hayden Geological Survey of 1871.

== Early career ==
Stevenson helped to lead the management of the United States Geological Survey from 1868-1872. In 1867 and 1868 he himself joined summer expeditions, namely in Nebraska. In 1869 he took part in a trip to the eastern Rocky Mountains in Colorado and New Mexico. In 1870, he joined a trip on the Platte River and the Green River Basin. In 1871, Stevenson acted as executive officer and general manager to the first geological surveying trip into Yellowstone National Park, where he also conducted his own geological collecting.

On April 18, 1872, Stevenson married Matilda Coxe Stevenson (née Evans) before leaving for another geological survey expedition under Ferdinand V. Hayden to Colorado, Idaho, Wyoming, and Utah. On that trip, Stevenson organized the Snake River Expedition entering Yellowstone via the Teton Mountain Range. Stevenson "nearly lost his life through slipping and falling several hundred feet on the snow, but miraculously escaped, and persisted in an effort to reach the summit, which he accomplished." At the mountaintop he is reported to have found an "ancient stone altar."

From 1873 to 1876, Stevenson collected and acted as executive officer for Hayden's surveying party in Colorado. In 1877 they went to Idaho, Wyoming, and Utah; and in 1878 back to Yellowstone Park, where he made the most complete collection of specimens and scientific evidence relating to geysers there, which were transferred to the Smithsonian. As a result of James' work there, in the first hydrographic survey of Yellowstone lake published by Henry W. Elliott, the largest island was named Stevenson Island and an overlooking peak Mount Stevenson.

In 1878 James and Matilda Stevenson together began ethnographic study, focused on the Ute and Arapaho people. In 1879, the Hayden Survey was disbanded, and the US government created the Bureau of American Ethnology (BAE). John Wesley Powell, founder and director of the new organization, appointed Stevenson as a specialist in ethnological work, and he began (along with wife Matilda Coxe Stevenson) to conduct research among a number of Pueblos along the Rio Grande, and among the Zuni. Matilda Stevenson was appointed "volunteer coadjutor [sic] in ethnology."

In 1879, 1880 and 1881, Stevenson made an "exhaustive" collection of pottery, costumes, and ceremonial objects from the Zunis including a complete collection of sacred "animal fetiches." He also worked with Frank Hamilton Cushing on collecting, as Cushing could speak the language and secure names for the items. Victor Mindeleff also worked as an assistant. 1881 he also visited the Hopi, collecting extensively there. The report of the Bureau of American Ethnology of 1881 details that the Stevensons collected over 4,900 pueblo items from Northwestern New Mexico and Northeastern Arizona.

== Later Professional Career ==
James Stevenson did not author many publications in his lifetime. James purportedly disliked writing. However, Matilda Coxe Stevenson was instrumental in preparing reports, catalogs, and analyses for publication in the Bureau of Ethnology Annual Reports. The Stevensons formed the first husband-wife team in anthropology.

James Stevenson died due to Rocky Mountain fever. At the time of his death, the couple had been preparing an ethnography of the Zia people of New Mexico. Matilda built a strong career after her training with James.

Some accounts report Stevenson asked to buy the Zia tribe's sacred pot, which was decorated the tribe's Zia symbol, which the tribe declined. The ceremonial pot then disappeared and reappeared in a museum collection. Stevenson's own book, now out of print, apparently referenced the theft. Leslie A. White wrote a book, Zia: The Sun Symbol Pueblo, which also documented the theft of the pottery.

== Legacy ==
Mr. Stevenson left few manuscripts behind him; but of these some are of great interest. He was too busy to write much. He was emphatically a man of deeds, not of words. On the one hand this might seem to be a fact to be regretted; on, on the other hand, if he had spent more time in recording there would have been less to chronicle.

— John Wesley Powell, "James Stevenson"

Artifacts collected by Matilda and James Stevenson are in the collections of the Department of Anthropology in the National Museum of Natural History of the Smithsonian Institution. Papers from Stevenson are in the Institution's National Anthropological Archives.
