= Lhamana =

Zuni gender-nonconforming people

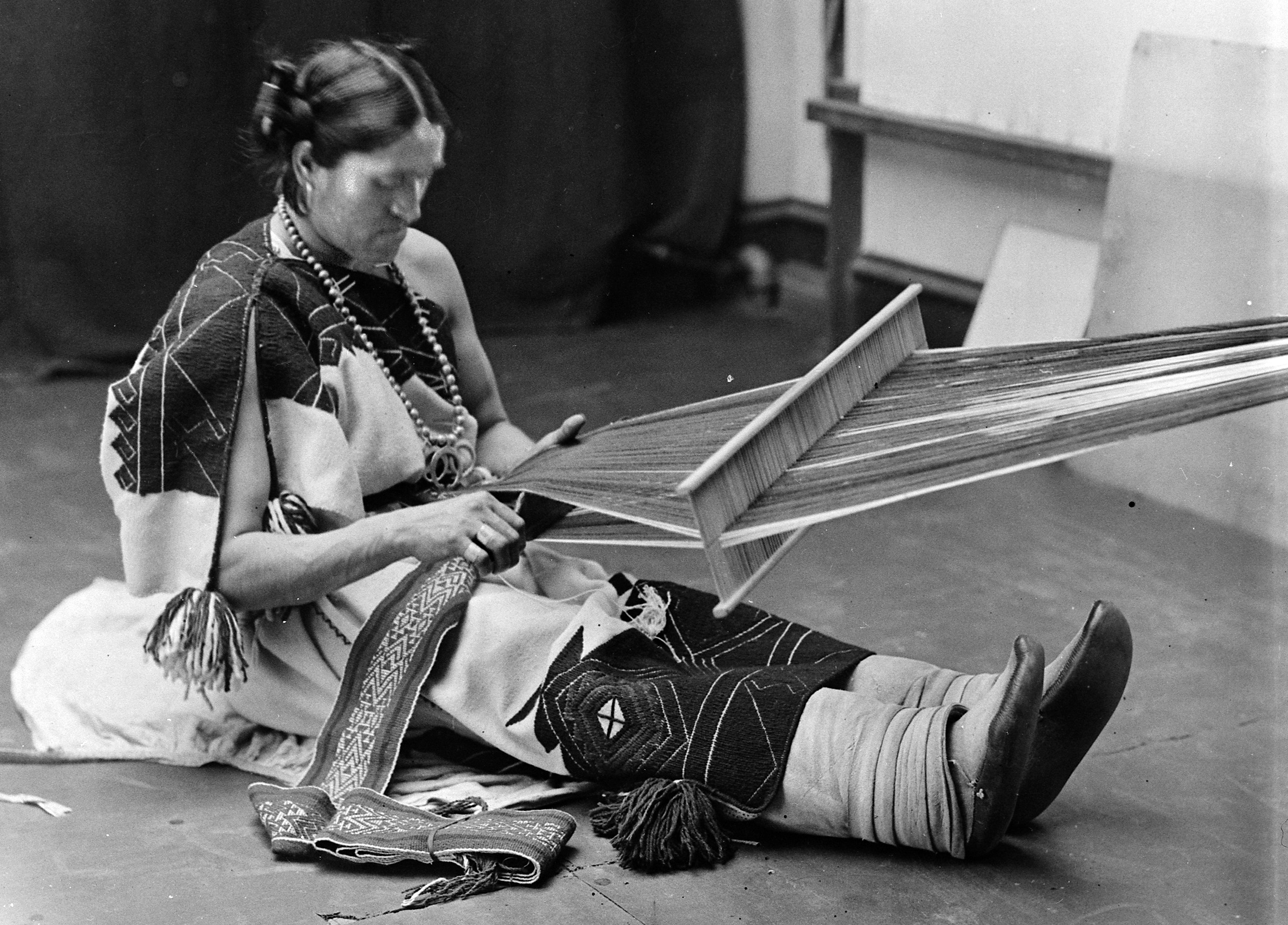
We'wha, a notable Zuni lhamana fiber artist and cultural ambassador, weaving on a backstrap loom

Lhamana, in traditional Zuni culture, are biologically male people who take on the social and ceremonial roles usually performed by women in their culture, at least some of the time. They wear a mixture of women's and men's clothing and much of their work is in the areas usually occupied by Zuni women. Some contemporary lhamana participate in the pan-Indian two-spirit community.

The most famous lhamana was We'wha (1849–1896), who in 1886 was part of the Zuni delegation to Washington D.C., where We'wha met with President Grover Cleveland.

== Social role ==
Accounts from the 1800s note that the lhamana, while dressed in "female attire", were often hired for work that required "strength and endurance", such as hunting big game and chopping firewood.

In addition to doing heavy work, some lhamana people have excelled at traditional arts and crafts such as pottery and weaving. We'wha, in particular, was a noted weaver.

Both masculine and feminine pronouns have been used for lhamana people. Writing about her friend We'wha, anthropologist Matilda Coxe Stevenson described We'wha as:

She performs masculine religious and judicial functions at the same time that she performs feminine duties, tending to laundry and the garden.

...the most intelligent person in the pueblo. Strong character made his word law among both men and women with whom he associated. Though his wrath was dreaded by men as well as women, he was loved by all children, to whom he was ever kind.

Though generally seen by European colonialists and modern adherents of queer studies as gay, LGBT or transgender, the Zuni lhamana, like other Indigenous social, cultural and ceremonial roles, exist in an Indigenous matrix. Indigenous writers on these roles feel that these identities cannot be reduced solely to same-sex desire or adherence to a conventional set of gender roles, even modern transgender or genderqueer ones.
