= Cactolith =

A cactolith is a type of igneous intrusion, a "quasi-horizontal chonolith composed of anastomosing ductoliths, whose distal ends curl like a harpolith, thin out like a sphenolith, or bulge discordantly like an akmolith or ethmolith"; i.e. a laccolith which looks like a cactus.

The term was coined by Charles B. Hunt, a USGS researcher, in his paper "Geology and geography of the Henry Mountains region, Utah" (1953). He was in fact describing an actual geological feature that resembled a cactus, but said later that the deliberately-absurd term was "intended to call attention satirically to the absurd nomenclature geologists were developing by applying new names to the infinite variety of shapes intrusions can form".
