= Mount Hillers =

Mountain summit in Utah

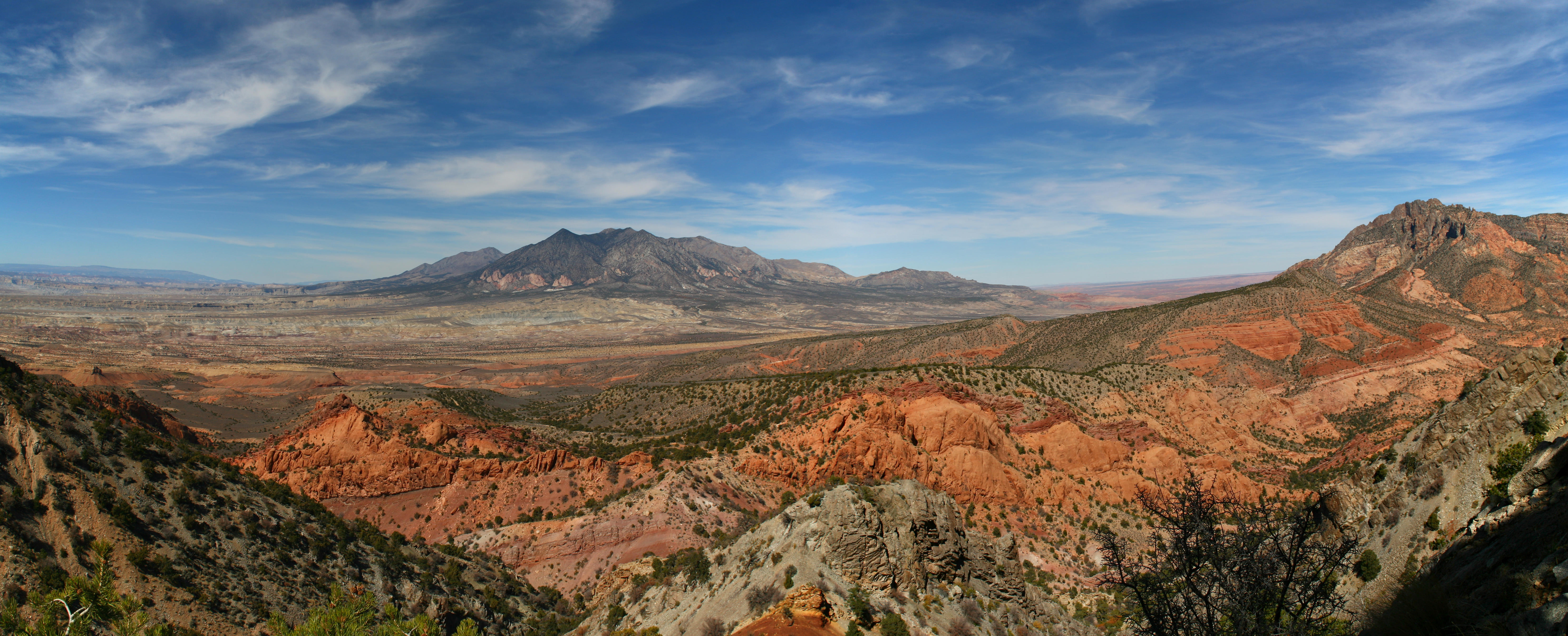
- Mount Hillers at the core of the Henry Mountains

Highest point
- Elevation: 10,741 ft (3,274 m) NAVD 88
- Prominence: 3,337 ft (1,017 m)
- Parent peak: Mount Pennell (11,413 ft)
- Isolation: 7.01 mi (11.28 km)
- Coordinates: 37°53′15″N 110°41′51″W

Naming
- Etymology: John Karl Hillers

Geography
- Location within Utah Location within the United States
- Location: Garfield County, Utah, U.S.
- Parent range: Henry Mountains
- Topo map: USGS Cass Creek Peak

Geology
- Rock age: Oligocene
- Mountain type: Laccolith
- Rock type: Igneous

Climbing
- Easiest route: class 3 scrambling

Mount Hillers is a summit in the Henry Mountains range, in Garfield County, Utah, in the United States. Its elevation is 10,741 feet (3,274 m) NAVD 88.

It was named by Almon Harris Thompson for John Karl Hillers, a government photographer.

== Climate ==
Spring and fall are the most favorable seasons to visit Mount Hillers. According to the Köppen climate classification system, it is located in a Cold semi-arid climate zone, which is defined by the coldest month having an average mean temperature below 32 °F (0 °C), and at least 50% of the total annual precipitation being received during the spring and summer. This desert climate receives less than 10 inches (250 millimeters) of annual rainfall, and snowfall is generally light during the winter.

== See also ==
- Colorado Plateau
- Laccolith
- List of mountain peaks of Utah

== Gallery ==
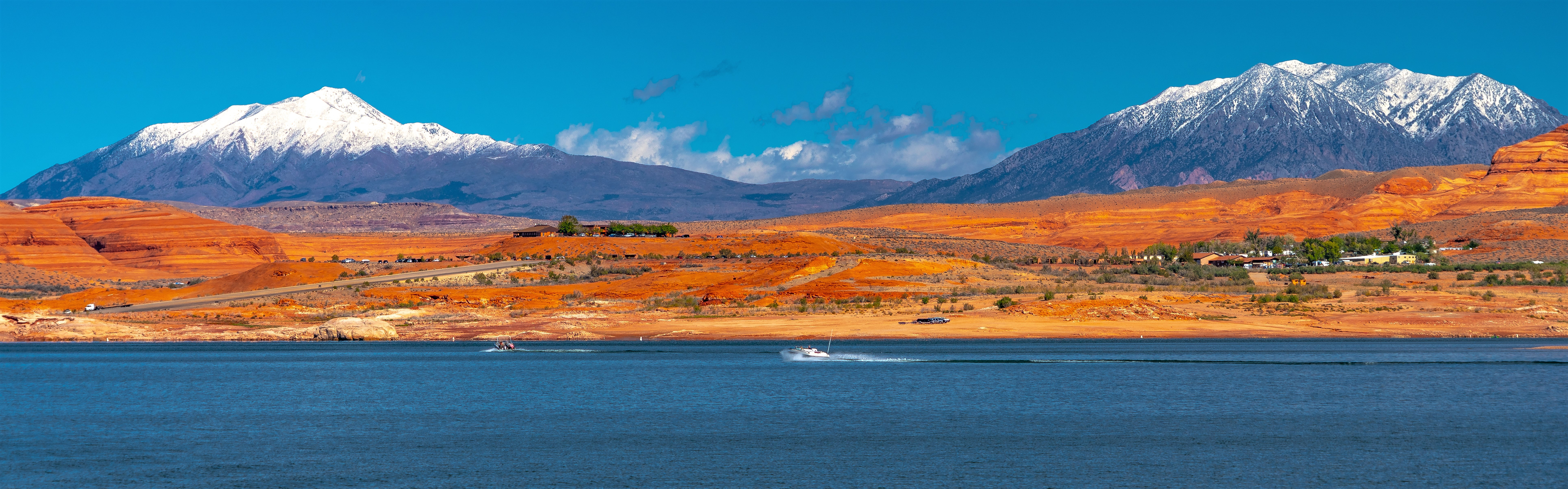
Mt. Hillers (right) and parent Mt. Pennell (left), seen from Lake Powell

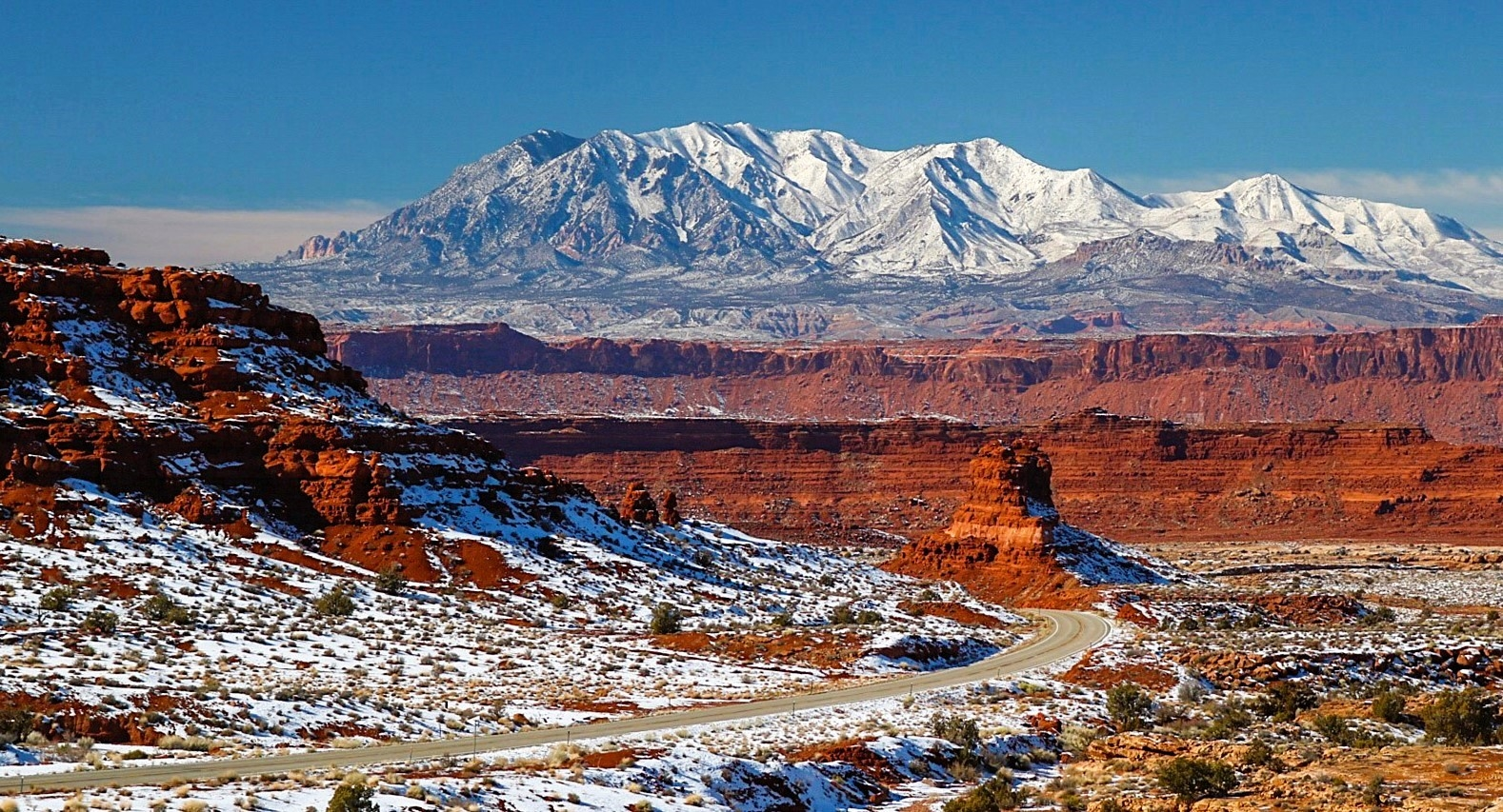
East aspect
