= Mount Pennell =

Mountain summit in Utah

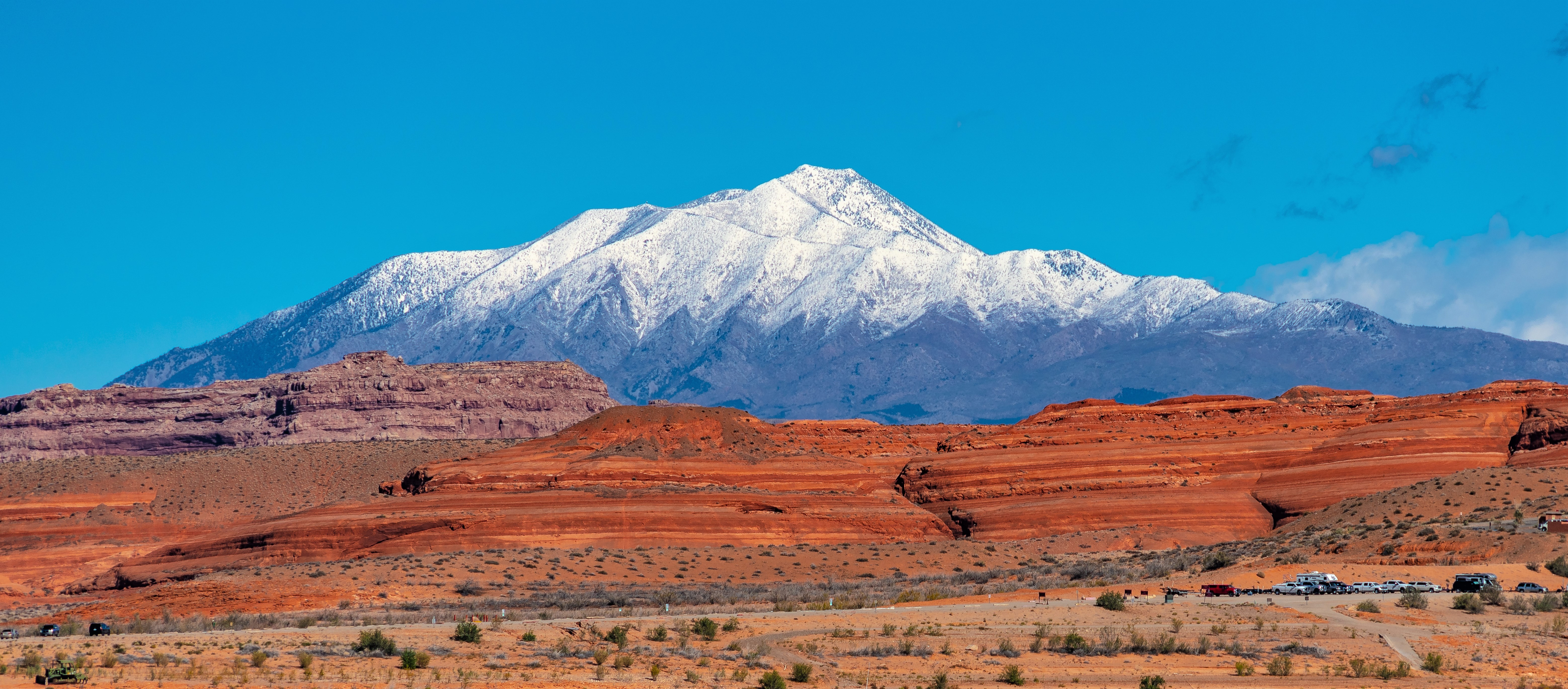
- Mount Pennell, south aspect

Highest point
- Elevation: 11,413 ft (3,479 m)
- Prominence: 3,568 ft (1,088 m)
- Parent peak: Mount Ellen (11,527 ft)
- Isolation: 10.62 mi (17.09 km)
- Coordinates: 37°57′24″N 110°47′27″W

Naming
- Etymology: Joseph Pennell

Geography
- Location within Utah Location within the United States
- Country: United States
- State: Utah
- County: Garfield
- Parent range: Henry Mountains
- Topo map: USGS Mount Pennell

Geology
- Rock age: Oligocene
- Mountain type: Laccolith
- Rock type: Igneous

Climbing
- Easiest route: class 2 scrambling

Mount Pennell is a prominent 11,413-foot (3,478 m) elevation summit located in eastern Garfield County, Utah, United States. Mount Pennell is the second-highest mountain in the Henry Mountains, following Mount Ellen, 10.6 miles to the north. It is situated in a dry, rugged, and sparsely settled region east of Capitol Reef National Park, on primitive land administered by the Bureau of Land Management. Several deep canyons cut the sides of the mountain, which on the higher slopes supports oak, Ponderosa pine, subalpine fir, spruce, Douglas fir, and aspen. Precipitation runoff from this mountain drains into tributaries of the nearby Colorado River.

== History ==
This mountain was first called Un-chu'-ka-ret by the native Paiute.

Almon Harris Thompson served as chief topographer and geographer of John Wesley Powell's Second Geographical Expedition (1871–1875) when he named Mount Ellen after his wife, Ellen Powell Thompson, and Mount Pennell was later named for his friend Joseph Pennell (1857–1926), an American artist and author.

The American geologist Grove Karl Gilbert surveyed this area in 1875 and 1876, and published his findings in 1879 as a monograph, The Geology of the Henry Mountains. The term laccolith was first applied as laccolite by Gilbert after his study of intrusions of diorite in the Henry Mountains.

== Climate ==
Spring and fall are the most favorable seasons to visit Mount Pennell. According to the Köppen climate classification system, it is located in a cold semi-arid climate zone, which is defined by the coldest month having an average mean temperature below 32 °F (0 °C), and at least 50% of the total annual precipitation being received during the spring and summer. This desert climate receives less than 10 inches (250 millimeters) of annual rainfall, and snowfall is generally light during the winter.

== See also ==
- Colorado Plateau
- Laccolith
- List of mountain peaks of Utah

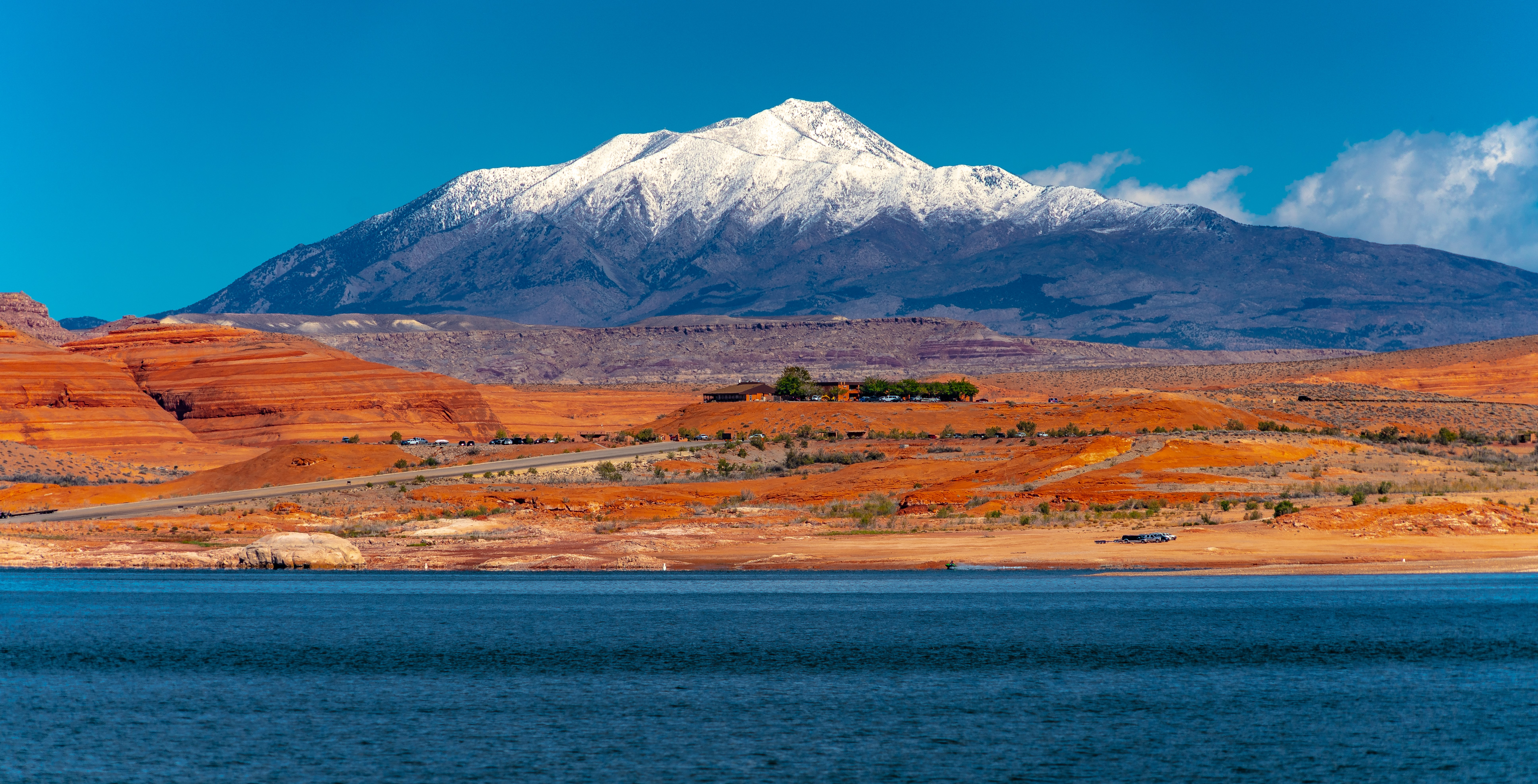
Mount Pennell from Lake Powell at Bullfrog-Halls Crossing
