= Chonolith =

Type of igneous rock body

In geology, a chonolith is a type of igneous rock intrusion (also known as pluton). Igneous rock intrusions are bodies of igneous rock that are formed by the crystallization of cooled magma below the Earth’s surface. These formations are termed intrusive rocks due the magma intruding rock layers but never reaching the surface. However, sometimes portions of plutons can become exposed at the Earth’s surface and thus the minerals can be observed since they are large enough. The different plutonic formations are named based on the different shapes that the cooled crystallized magma takes. However, all plutonic formations that have irregular shapes and do not share the same characteristics as other plutonic structures are termed chonoliths. Other plutonic structures that have specific shapes include: dikes, sills, laccoliths and sheets. Another unique characteristic of chonoliths is that there is a floor or base present which is typically absent in other types of intrusions.

== Formation ==
The rocks on Earth’s surface are continuously subject to different types of forces, including tensional, compressional and shear stress. When these rocks are under this kind of stress, they are forced to deform causing them to take on different types of shapes. For example, as tectonic plates are pushed together, rocks undergo compressional stress due to the shortening and thickening of the crust thus forming mountain formations. Whereas, tensional stress due to tectonic plates being pulled apart causes rock formations to become faulted creating rift valleys. In the occurrence of different types of rock deformations, there are oftentimes cavities left behind. The magma that rises out of the lithosphere, the rigid outermost shell of the Earth, fills these cavities up from either below, the side or from above. This magma then slowly cools down since the surrounding rocks act as an insulator. Once it completely cools down and crystallizes it turns into a large igneous body. This process can often take tens of thousands years to complete due to the slow cooling of the magma. Igneous rock bodies can be injected either passively by filling in spaces between rocks or actively by forcing apart rock formations and filling it in. The plutons are then classified based on the shape and characteristics it has. Any type of igneous rock intrusion that does not have a shape that can be classified as the other classifications, including dikes, sills and laccoliths, and are irregular in shape are said to be chonoliths.

== Examples ==
- Spring Gulch chonolith composed of aplite, in Elko County in Nevada, US.

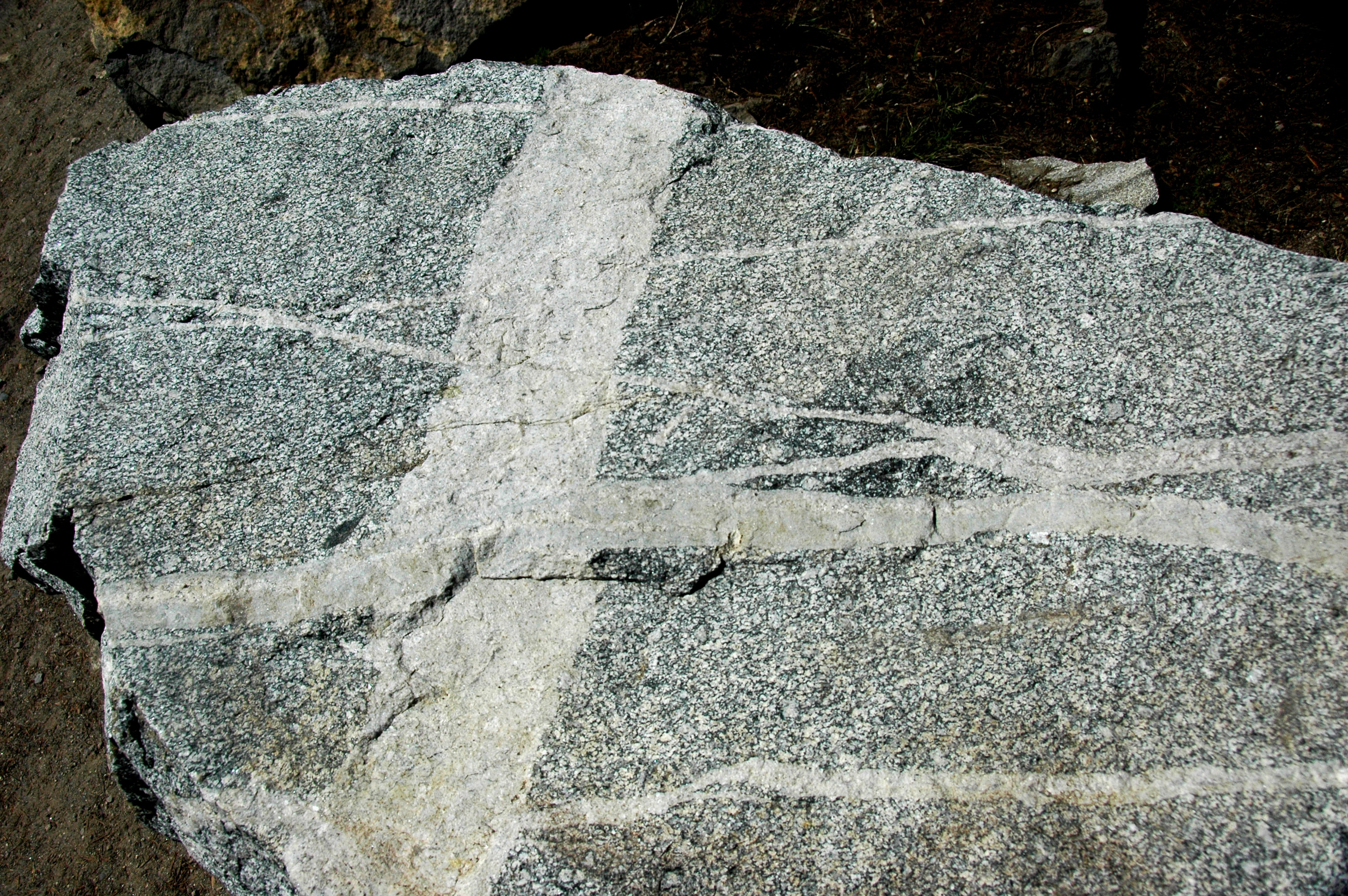
Apilite Dike in Sierra Nevada in a Batholith host rock

The outcrops of the Spring Gulch reveal a complex shape and there is an exposure to Missipian shale. For this reason, this igneous rock intrusion is termed a chonolith. The Spring Gulch is composed of fine grained leucocratic granite. This is also known as aplite. Altogether, the Spring Gulch chonolith forms hypabyssal intrusive bodies which are mainly centered around the Spring Gulch. The granite found in the Spring Gulch chonolith is a two-mica granite, meaning that it is high in potassium and low in plagioclase. Due to its finely grained characteristic and its intense bleach, the Spring Gulch chonolith displays a prominent argillic alteration. The estimated age of the Spring Gulch chonolith is about 156.4±0.23 million years

- Chonolith of andesite near Shavano in Colorado, US
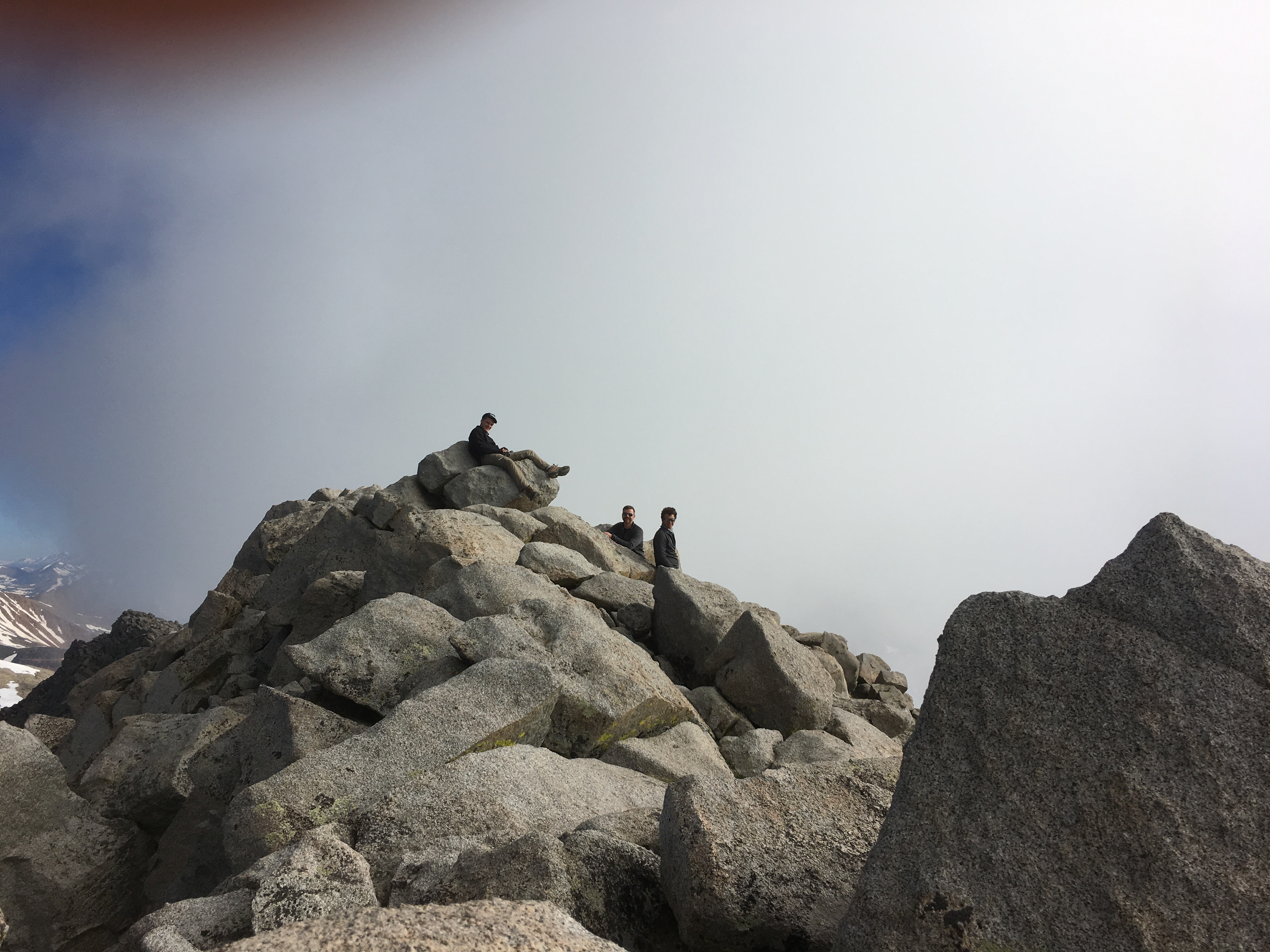
  Mount Shavano in Colorado, USA
- Nebo-Babel chonolith of gabbronorite in the West Musgrave area of Western Australia. Within the last 10 years, the Nebo-Babel chonolith became the largest nickel sulfide discovery in the West Musgrave Block, Western Australia. This pluton is a large Ni-Cu-platinum-group element (PGE) sulphide deposit and is mainly made up of gabbronorite. This specific chonolith has a tube-like shape and extends for about 5 km
- Chonoliths in Norilsk, Russia

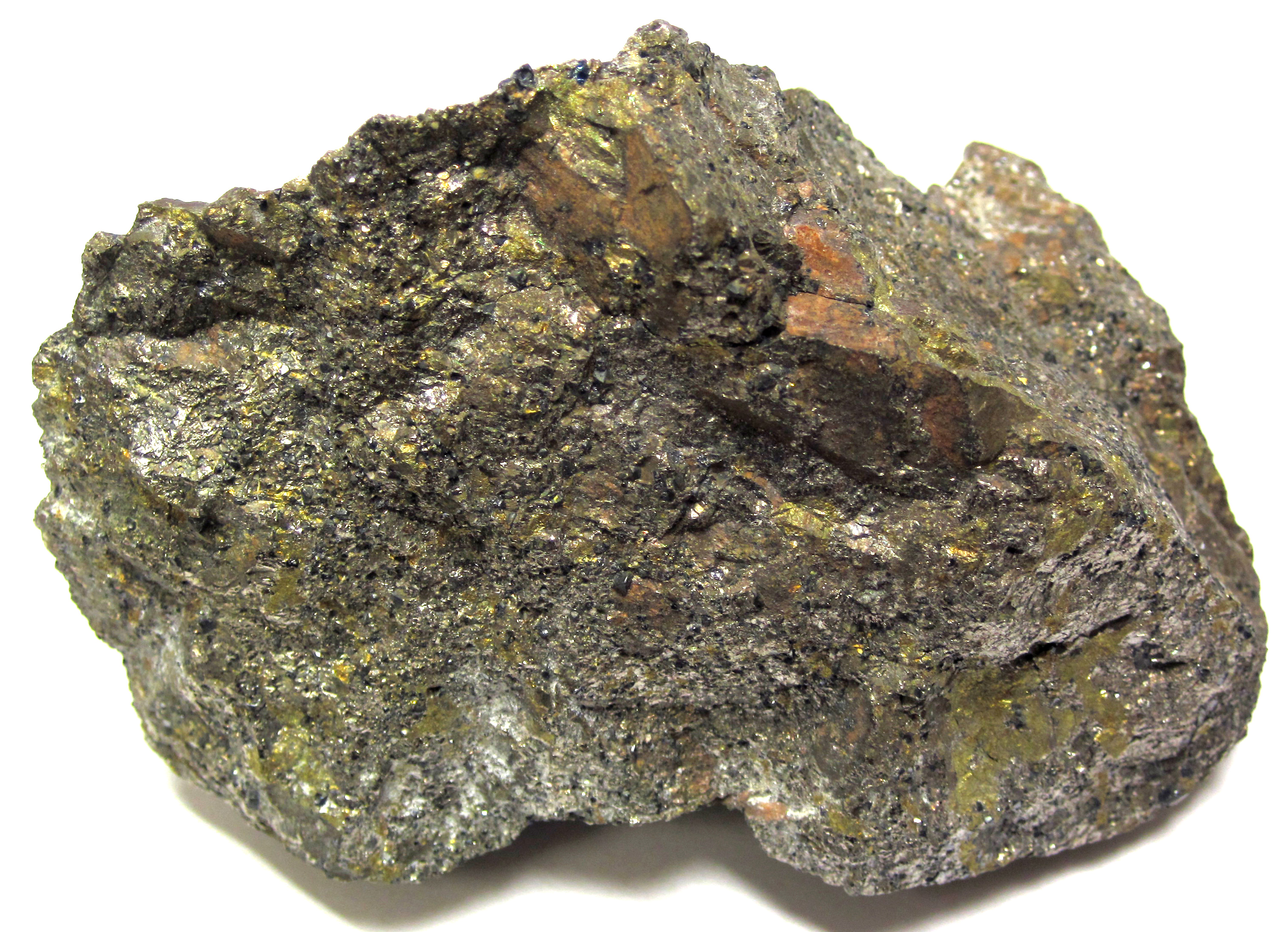
Sulfide with pyrrhotite-magnetite-chalcopyrite (copper ore) in Norilsk Mining District, Northern Siberia, Russia

The Siberian continental flood basalt (CFB) province was formed at the Permo-Triassic boundary when a superplume was surrounded by subducting oceanic crust slabs. It is thought that the igneous rock intrusions and the flood basalt events lasted around 2 to 4 million years. There are substantial Cu-Ni-PGE sulfide deposits found within the mafic intrusive igneous rock formations located under the flood basalts. This specific pluton is 20 km in length.

- Chonolith of dacite of Pleistocene age in Chinkuashih, Taiwan.

The chonolith found in Chinkuashih, Taiwan, dates back to the Pleistocene age. It is thought that this specific chonolith intruded the water-saturated Miocene sediments. This pluton is composed of dacite, a type of volcanic rock that is formed by lava. Ore can be found in the altered argillized dacite. As there is already a copper-gold producing mine located in this area, the chonolith provides a good source of arsenical copper-gold ores.

- Chonolith of Cretaceous age in the Cortez Mountains, near Carlin in Nevada, US.

== See also ==
- Cactolith, a laccolith in the Henry Mountains region, Utah
