= Mount Holmes (Utah) =

Mountain summit in Utah

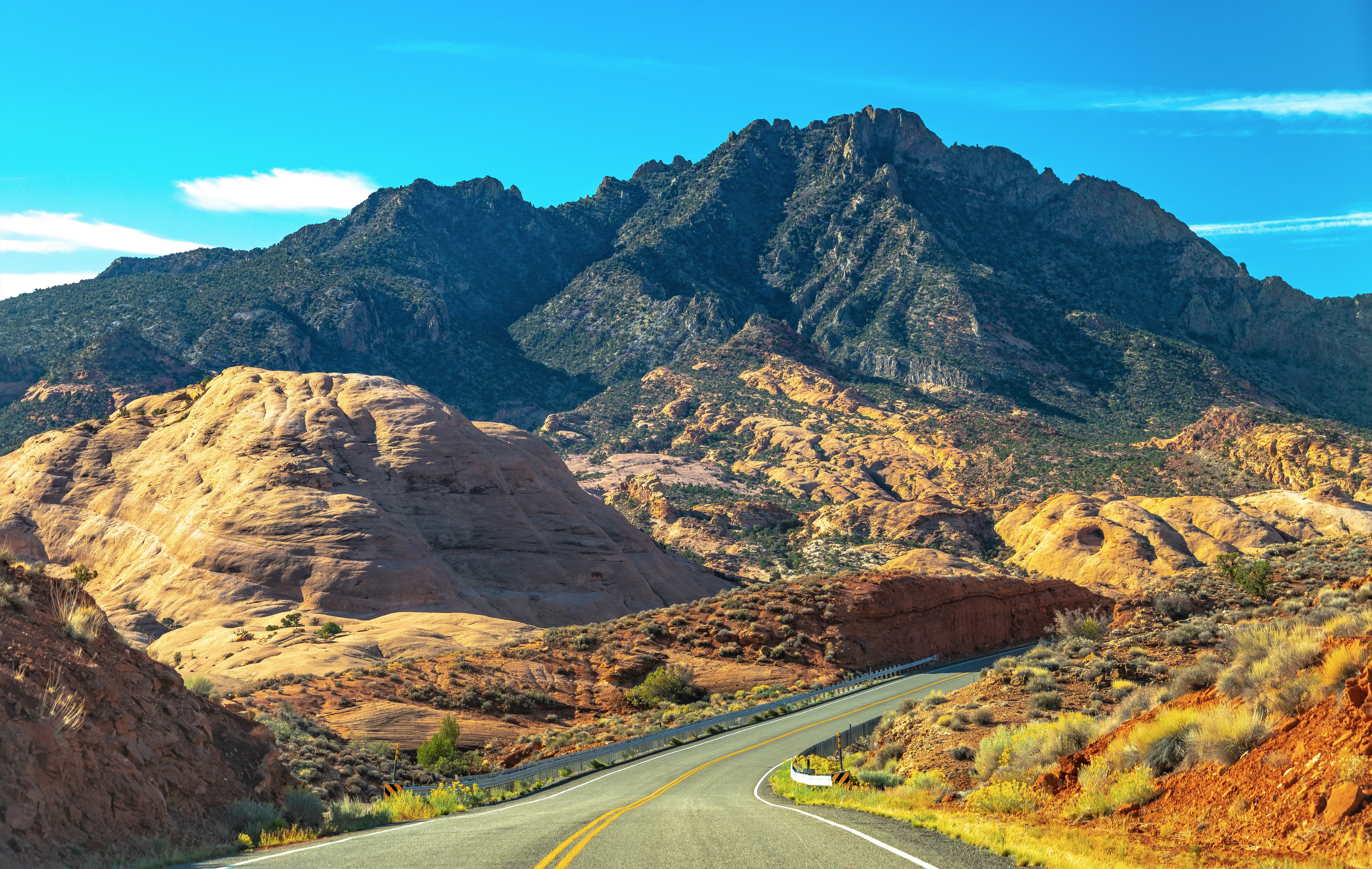
- North aspect, from Highway 276

Highest point
- Elevation: 7,998 ft (2,438 m)
- Prominence: 2,278 ft (694 m)
- Parent peak: Mount Ellsworth (8,235 ft)
- Isolation: 4.09 mi (6.58 km)
- Coordinates: 37°47′51″N 110°34′59″W

Naming
- Etymology: William Henry Holmes

Geography
- Location within Utah Location within the United States
- Location: Garfield County, Utah, U.S.
- Parent range: Henry Mountains
- Topo map: USGS Mount Holmes

Geology
- Rock age: Oligocene
- Mountain type: Laccolith
- Rock type: Igneous

Climbing
- Easiest route: class 2+ scrambling

Mount Holmes is a 7,998-foot (2,438 m) elevation summit located in eastern Garfield County, Utah, United States. Mount Holmes is part of the Henry Mountains. It is situated in a dry, rugged, and sparsely settled region west of Glen Canyon National Recreation Area, on primitive land administered by the Bureau of Land Management. Precipitation runoff from this mountain drains into tributaries of the nearby Colorado River, which here is Lake Powell six miles to the east of this mountain.

== History ==
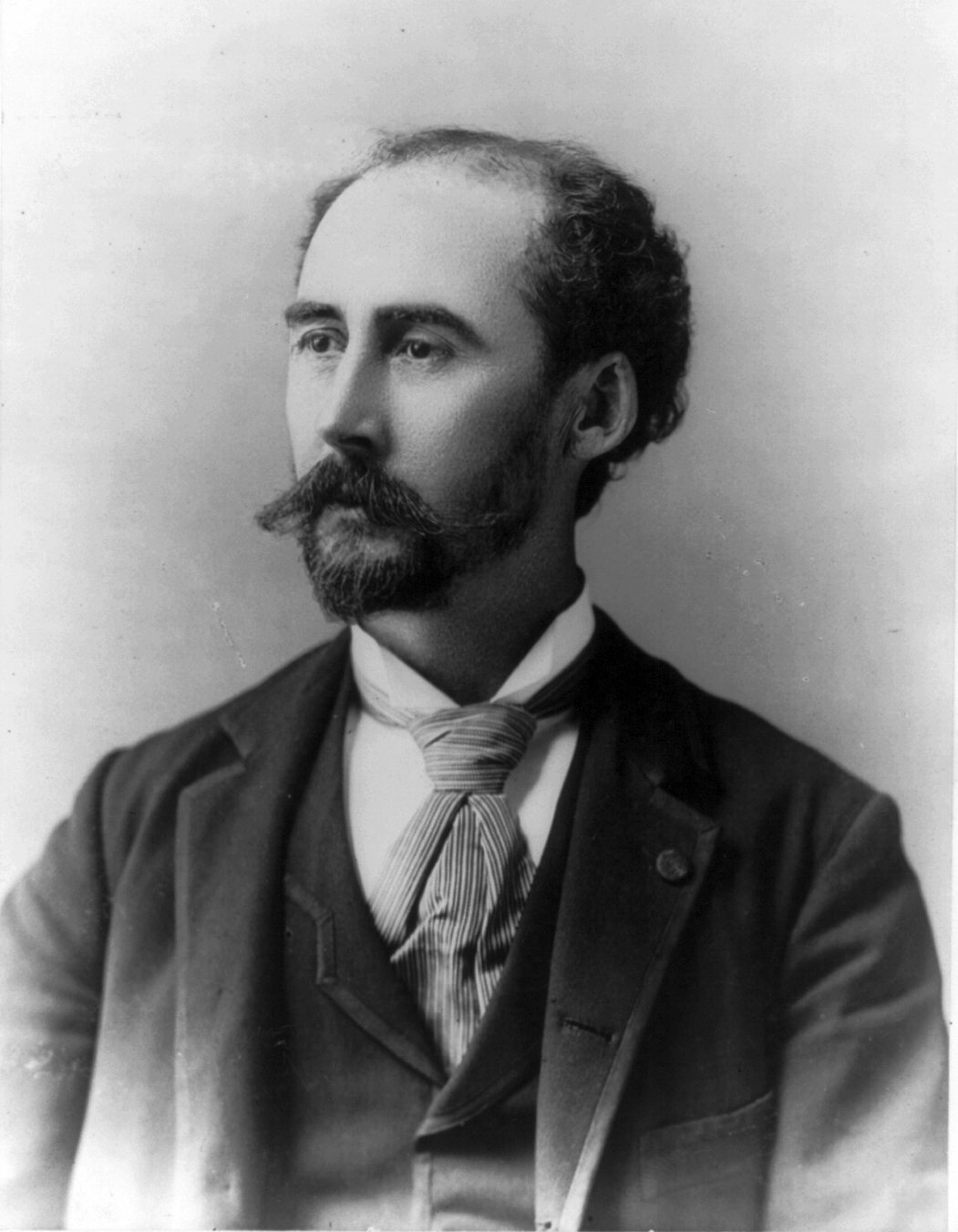
Holmes

The American geologist Grove Karl Gilbert surveyed this area in 1875 and 1876, and published his findings in 1879 as a monograph, The Geology of the Henry Mountains. The term laccolith was first applied as laccolite by Gilbert after his study of intrusions of diorite in the Henry Mountains. Mount Holmes was named about 1878 by Grove Karl Gilbert who would become the chief geologist of the United States Geological Survey in 1889, for William Henry Holmes (1846–1933), who provided an illustration of the Grand Canyon which appeared in the 1879 Report on Lands of the Arid Region of The United States by John Wesley Powell. There is another Mount Holmes located in Yellowstone National Park which is named for this same person.

== Climate ==
Spring and fall are the most favorable seasons to visit Mount Holmes. According to the Köppen climate classification system, it is located in a Cold semi-arid climate zone, which is defined by the coldest month having an average mean temperature below 32 °F (0 °C), and at least 50% of the total annual precipitation being received during the spring and summer. This desert climate receives less than 10 inches (250 millimeters) of annual rainfall, and snowfall is generally light during the winter.

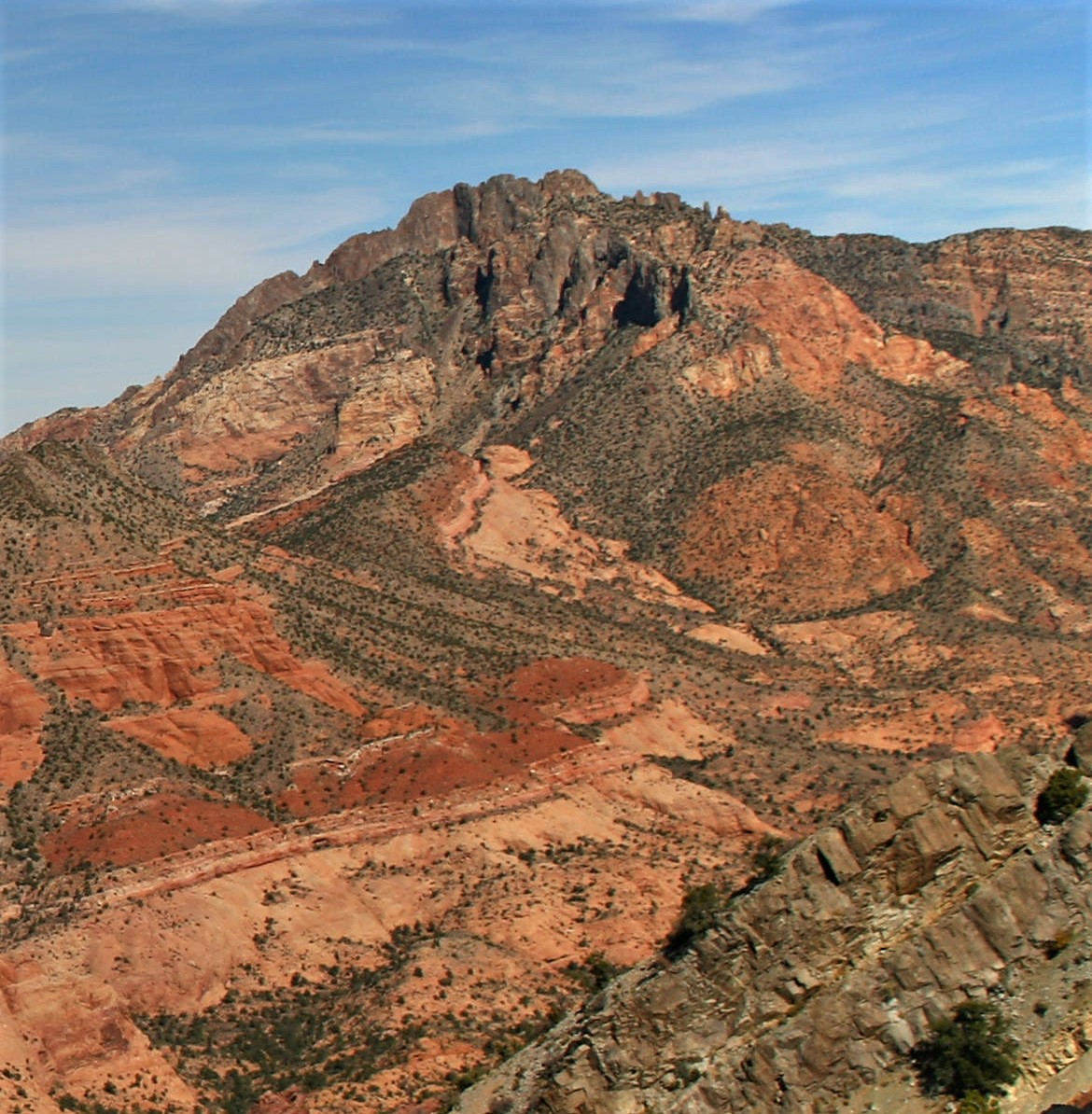
Mt. Holmes, southwest aspect

== See also ==
- Colorado Plateau
- List of mountain peaks of Utah
