= Mount Ellen =

Mount Ellen may refer to:

- Mount Ellen (Utah)
- Mount Ellen (Vermont)
- Mount Ellen, village located between Muirhead and Gartcosh in North Lanarkshire, Scotland
