= Mount Ellsworth (Utah) =

Mountain in Utah, United States

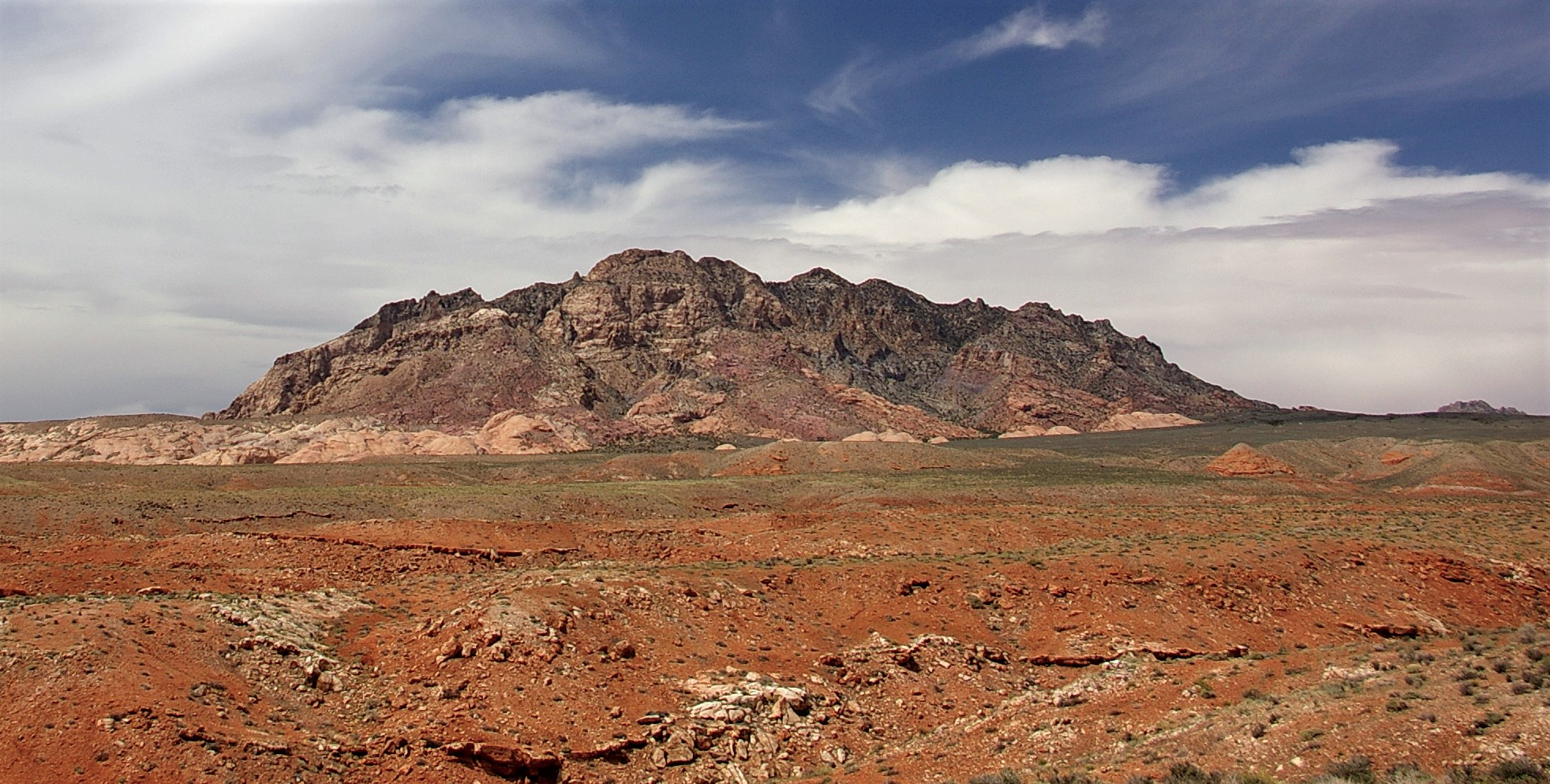
- South aspect

Highest point
- Elevation: 8,235 ft (2,510 m)
- Prominence: 2,915 ft (888 m)
- Parent peak: Mount Hillers (10,737 ft)
- Isolation: 9.89 mi (15.92 km)
- Coordinates: 37°44′46″N 110°37′12″W

Geography
- Location within Utah Location within the United States
- Location: Garfield County, Utah, U.S.
- Parent range: Henry Mountains
- Topo map: USGS Ticaboo Mesa

Geology
- Rock age: Oligocene
- Mountain type: Laccolith
- Rock type(s): Igneous and sandstone

Climbing
- Easiest route: class 2 scrambling

Mount Ellsworth is an 8,235-foot (2,510 m) elevation summit located in Garfield County, Utah, United States. Mount Ellsworth is part of the Henry Mountains. It is situated in a dry, rugged, and sparsely settled region west of Glen Canyon National Recreation Area, on primitive land administered by the Bureau of Land Management. Precipitation runoff from this mountain drains into tributaries of the nearby Colorado River, which here is Lake Powell eight miles to the east of this mountain.

== History ==
The American geologist Grove Karl Gilbert surveyed this area in 1875 and 1876, and published his findings in 1879 as a monograph, The Geology of the Henry Mountains. The term laccolith was first applied as laccolite by Gilbert after his study of intrusions of diorite in the Henry Mountains. Mount Ellsworth's name appeared on an 1875 map, but the origin is a mystery. One possibility is Elmer E. Ellsworth, (1837–1861). Gilbert did name nearby Mount Holmes, four miles to the northeast.

== Climate ==
Spring and fall are the most favorable seasons to visit Mount Ellsworth. According to the Köppen climate classification system, it is located in a Cold semi-arid climate zone, which is defined by the coldest month having an average mean temperature below 32 °F (0 °C), and at least 50% of the total annual precipitation being received during the spring and summer. This desert climate receives less than 10 inches (250 millimeters) of annual rainfall, and snowfall is generally light during the winter.

== Gallery ==
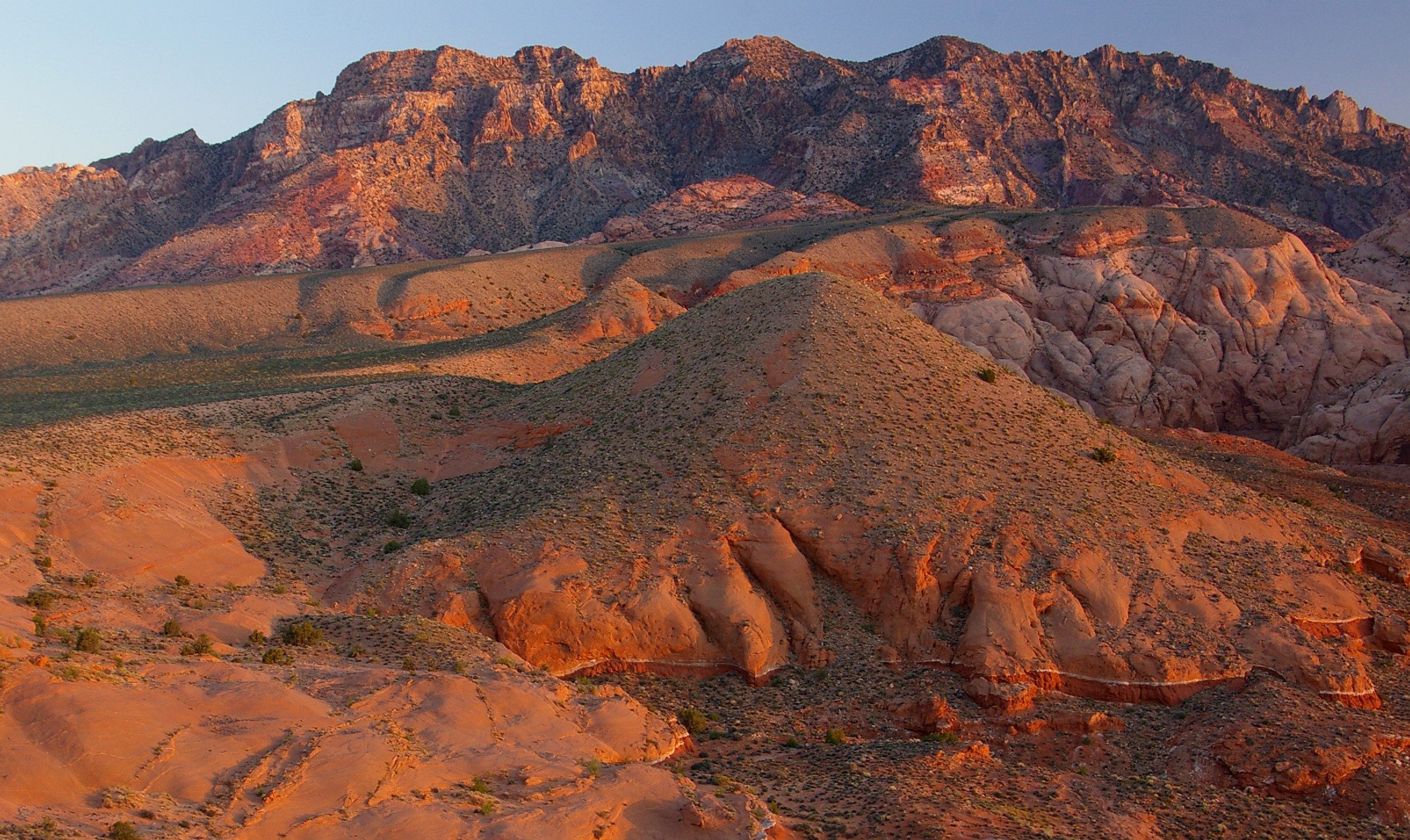

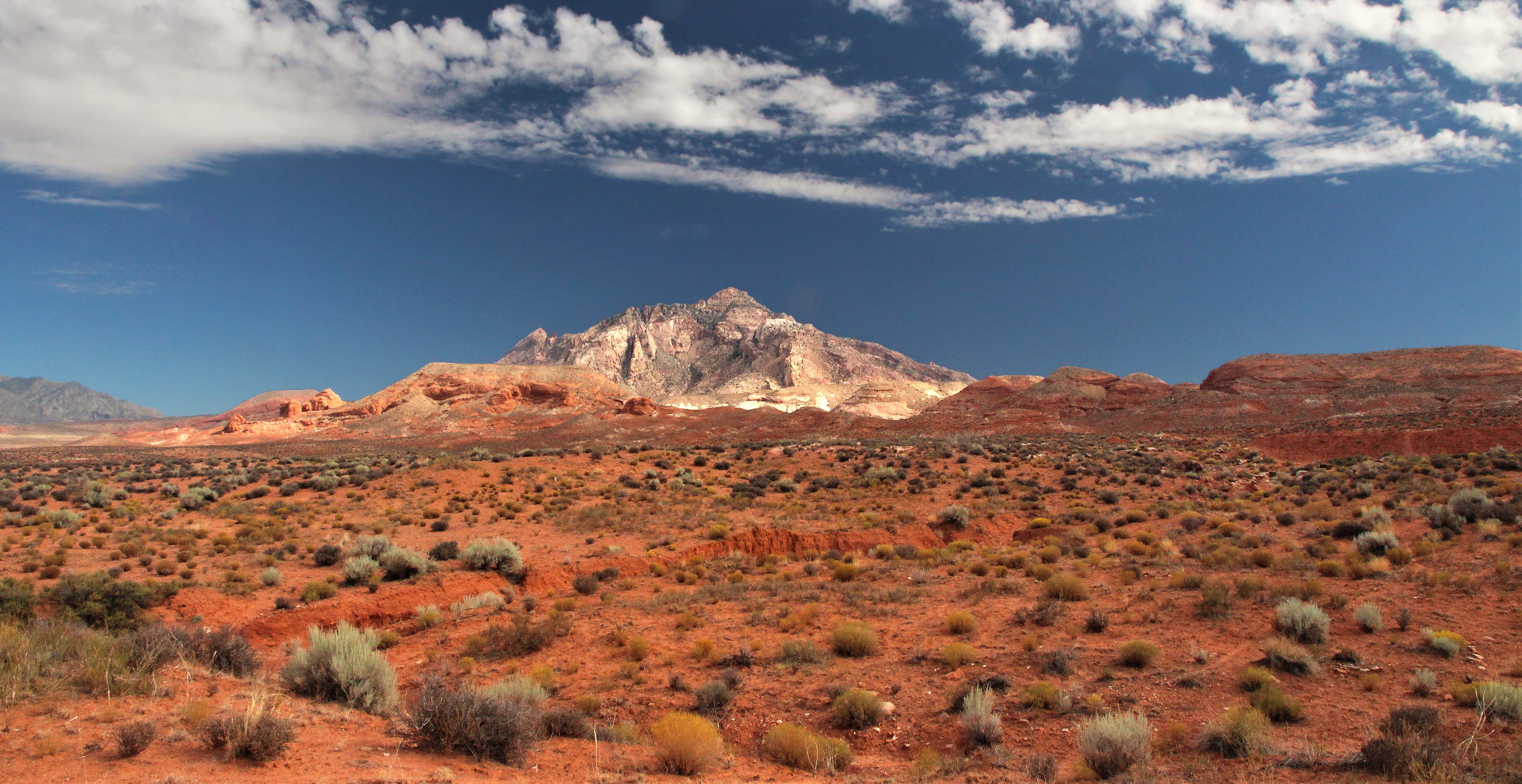

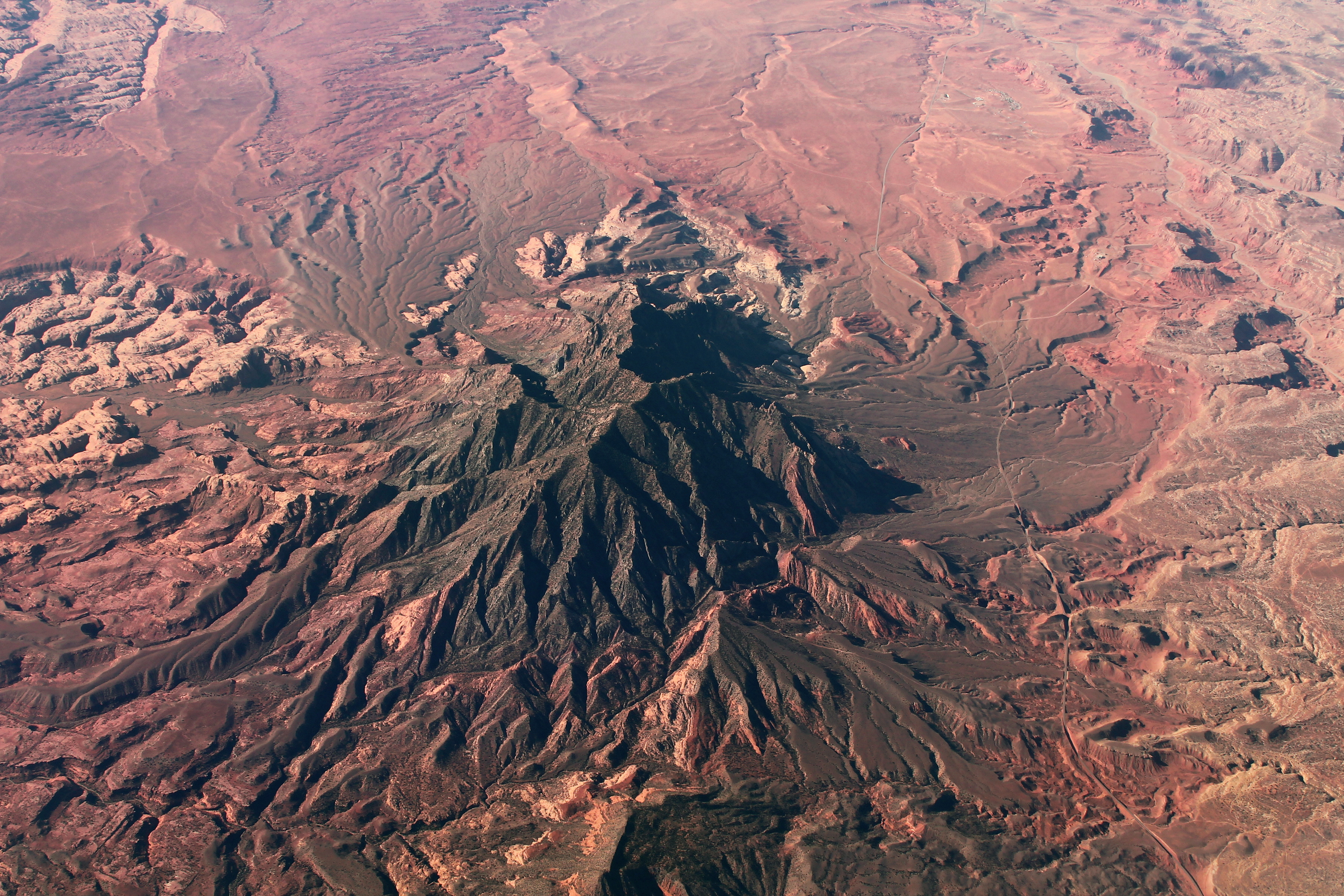
Aerial view, south at top of frame

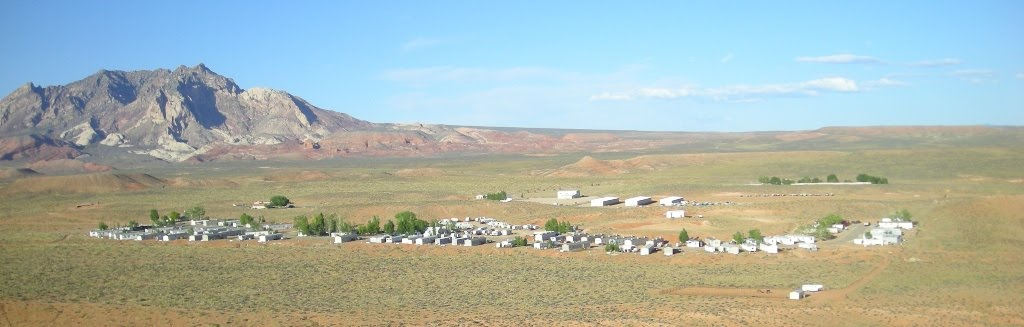
Ticaboo, Utah, with Ellsworth to left

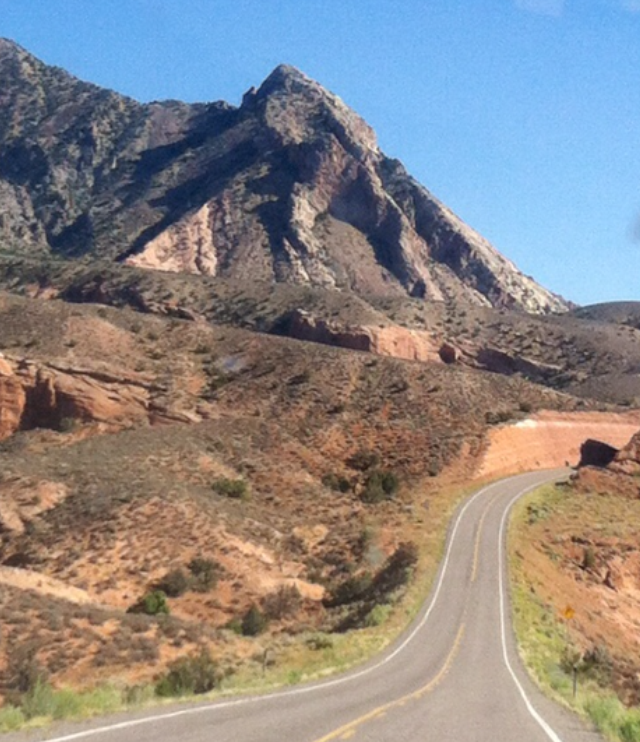
Nearby Bullfrog, Utah is named for this feature on Mt. Ellsworth that resembles a bullfrog, as seen from southbound Highway 276

== See also ==
- Colorado Plateau
- List of mountain peaks of Utah
