= Mount Ellsworth =

Mount Ellsworth can refer to:

- Mount Ellsworth (Antarctica), the highest peak in the Queen Maud Mountains in Antarctica
- Mount Ellsworth (Montana), in Glacier National Park, Montana, United States
- Mount Ellsworth (Utah), in the Henry Mountains, Utah, United States
