= Almon Harris Thompson =

American geologist (1839–1906)

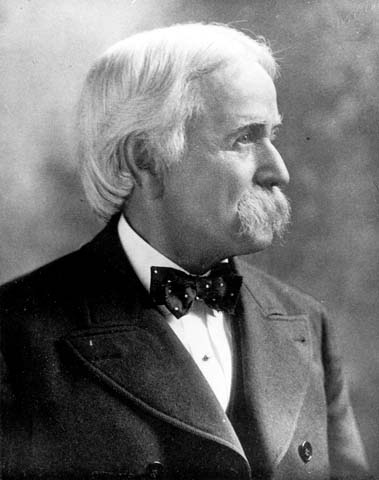
- Thompson in 1902
- Born: September 24, 1839; Stoddard, New Hampshire, United States
- Died: July 31, 1906 (aged 66)
- Occupations: Educator, topographer, geologist, explorer, Civil War veteran
- Spouse: Ellen Powell Thompson

Almon Harris Thompson (September 24, 1839 – July 31, 1906), also known as A. H. Thompson, was an American topographer, geologist, explorer, educator and Civil War veteran. Often called "The Professor" or simply "Prof", Thompson is perhaps best known for being second in command of John Wesley Powell's Second Geographical Expedition (1871–1875), a federally funded scientific expedition that retraced the route of Powell's original expedition in order to further explore and map the drainages and canyons of the Green and Colorado Rivers in what is now southern Utah and northern Arizona. Thompson's diary of the expedition was originally published in the Utah Historical Quarterly in 1939. Through his work on the Powell expeditions and later as a geographer at the U.S. Geological Survey, he was responsible for naming many geographic locations in the Western United States. Thompson is also known for being a founding member of the National Geographic Society.

== Early life and education ==
Thompson was born on September 24, 1839, in Stoddard, New Hampshire. Later, his family moved to Southborough, Worcester, Massachusetts (1848–1856), where he attended school. Thompson enjoyed mathematics and science. He attended Wheaton College in Illinois from 1857 to 1861, where he met John Wesley Powell. After graduation, he married Powell's sister, Ellen Louella (Nellie) Powell (1840–1909), on July 8, 1862, in Wheaton, Illinois. They had no children.

On May 16, 1864, Thompson enlisted in the United States Army, noting his residence as Hennepin, Illinois. He was commissioned as a lieutenant in Company B, 139th Illinois Volunteer Infantry Regiment on June 1, 1864. Thompson was part of the Hundred Days Men enlistment program near the end of the American Civil War. He mustered out in Peoria, Illinois, on October 28, 1864, as a 1st lieutenant.

After the war, Thompson served as superintendent of schools at Lacon, Illinois (1865–1867) and Bloomington, Illinois (1867–1868). In the 1870 census, Thompson was listed as living in Normal, Illinois, with his wife Ellen, mother Mary, as well as Emma and John Powell. Both Thompson and Powell are listed as schoolteachers.

== Expeditions ==
In 1867, Thompson's brother-in-law, John Wesley Powell, organized an expedition to the Rocky Mountains to collect specimens for the Illinois State Natural History Society. Thompson acted as the entomologist of the party. After the expedition, in 1868, Thompson resumed the superintendency of the Bloomington, Illinois, schools. He was appointed acting curator of the Illinois State Natural History Society in 1869.

Following the completion of Powell's first expedition through the unexplored canyon country of Utah and Arizona in 1869 (of which Thompson was not a member), Powell and Thompson began plans for what became known as Powell's Second Expedition, which intended to retrace the earlier route to provide photographs, more accurate maps, and further scientific study of the Colorado River and the surrounding country. They secured supplies at Fort Bridger and Salt Lake City to be shipped to three locations along the expedition route. The group set out from Green River, Wyoming, in May 1871, with the geographical work in Thompson's hands. He served as chief topographer and geographer, and was in charge of field operations when Powell was absent. Because Powell was often away from the work site, Thompson was often in charge. The explorers mapped much of Utah and northern Arizona while traveling by boat from Green River, Utah, to Lees Ferry.

In addition to the river survey, Thompson also led a significant overland expedition. Along with other members of the survey, he left Kanab, Utah, on May 30, 1872, to identify a passage to the mouth of the Dirty Devil River, where the Second Expedition crew had stored a boat. Their route led them along the Paria River, at the southern end of the Aquarius Plateau, over Boulder Mountain, through the Waterpocket Fold, and across the Henry Mountains. After finding the boat, Thompson mapped a return route overland while other members of the group took the boat downstream. In "Chapter X: Report on a Trip to the Mouth of the Dirty Devil River" in The Exploration of the Colorado River of the West, Thompson describes his experiences. During the trip, he named the Escalante River, the last river in the contiguous United States to be identified. He also became the first European American to reach the summit of the Henry Mountains, which likewise was the last mountain range in the contiguous United States to be surveyed. He named the highest peak Mount Ellen after his wife.

Ellen Powell Thompson accompanied her husband on some of his surveying activities, including trips into the mountains and boating the rapids of southern Utah. While residing in Kanab in 1872, she collected and identified many new types of plants.

Under Thompson's direction, the expedition created the first preliminary map of the southern Utah region in the winter of 1872–73. Ultimately, Thompson constructed maps of Utah, Wyoming, Arizona, and Nevada based on field work from the Powell expeditions. After the expedition, both Thompson and his wife returned to Aurora, Illinois. They were both listed as members of the Illinois State Association for Schoolmasters in 1873–1874.

Powell gave Thompson credit for his work in the Preface of one of their reports, stating, "Professor A. H. Thompson has been my companion and collaborator during the greater part of the time, and has had entire charge of the geographic work; the final maps will exhibit the results of this learning and executive ability".

In 1875, Thompson, along with Frederick Dellenbaugh, returned to Utah to focus on field studies and mapping of the land. At the completion of their expedition assignments in 1878, Thompson began to look for work. The April 25, 1878 Winfield (KS) Courier reported that Thompson was exploring locations to start a sheep business in Kansas. The 1880 census listed Thompson as living in Salem, Greenwood, Kansas, and working as a wool grower.

== After the Powell expeditions ==
In the early 1880s, Thompson began work for the U.S. Geological Survey under the new USGS director, John Wesley Powell. He and Ellen moved to Washington, D.C. Thompson was sent to New Mexico to begin topographical surveying. The Sundry Civil Bill of 1888 appropriated funding for an irrigation survey. Thompson directed work parties throughout the west.

Later, Thompson was appointed the chief geographer for the USGS. As a geographer and cartographer, he authored or co-authored many USGS maps, including maps of the Green River from the Union Pacific Railroad to the mouth of the White River. Thompson was also involved in a number of other projects, including serving as cartographer on projects in California, Colorado, Nevada, Idaho, Oregon, and Wyoming.

Thompson also devised a survey instrument used during geographical operations to provide measurements that could be used in determining the irrigable land. He contributed Chapter IX to the Report on the Lands of the Arid Region by John Wesley Powell. The chapter, titled "Irrigable Lands of the Portion of Utah Drained by the Colorado River and its Tributaries", focuses on river drainage, tributaries, and geography.

== National Geographic Society ==
Thompson was part of a tight-knit community of explorers, scientists and businessmen in Washington, D.C., interested in forming a geographic society. He was one of several signatories on an invitation to meet on January 13, 1888. Thompson called the meeting to order and introduced the resolution to form the society. Within two weeks, an organizing committee consisting of Thompson and others created the plan for the National Geographic Society. Serving as one of the vice-presidents of this new organization, Thompson was actively involved in its growth.

== Later years ==
In a report submitted July 1, 1893, Thompson described work conducted in all of the western states and the establishment of new field offices in California, Idaho, Oregon, and Washington. Thompson retained his post at the United States Geological Survey until his death on July 31, 1906. He was buried at Arlington National Cemetery in the Officers Section, Site 1567, in August 1906.

== Naming of geographic locations ==
Thompson is credited with naming many geographic locations during his work with John Wesley Powell and the USGS. He named the Waterpocket Fold in what is now Capitol Reef National Park, the Aquarius Plateau, the Markagunt Plateau, Mount Ellen, Boulder Mountain, Canaan Mountain, the Escalante River, and the town of Escalante in Garfield County, Utah.

Thompson had strong opinions about the need for principles to aid in geographic nomenclature. He stated that "a geographic name should be short, euphonic, pronounced as spelled, and have a meaning or express some sentiment to help fix it in the memory". In choosing geographic names during the Powell expeditions, Thompson selected a combination of Piute terms such as Kaibab and Toroweap, Mormon pioneer terms like Pipe Springs and Wild Band Pockets, and also used descriptive words like Tantalus Creek and Thousand Lakes Mountain.

Thompson Mesa in the Henry Mountains, Thompson Point in the Grand Canyon, Mount Thompson in the Sierra Nevada, and Thompson Peak in the Sangre de Cristo Mountains near Santa Fe were all named in honor of A. H. Thompson.

== Legacy ==
Thompson's accomplishments are often overlooked in history books and websites. Dellenbaugh notes that although Thompson was largely responsible for the "scientific and practical success of the second expedition", Powell ignored Thompson's contributions in his reports.

In the introduction to Thompson's diaries, Herbert Gregory states that "Thompson possessed that rare combination of qualities that brings success to the explorer: a rigid insistence on discipline and order of procedure, kindness toward his subordinates, and sympathetic interest in the native people with whom he came in contact".

Frederick Dellenbaugh, author of The Romance of the Colorado River and a fellow member of the Second Expedition, stated that "to his (Thompson's) foresight, rare good judgment, ability to think out a plan to the last minute detail, fine nerve and absolute lack of any kind of foolishness, together with a wide knowledge and intelligence, this expedition, and indeed the scientific work so admirably carried on by the United States Survey of the Rocky Mountain region and the Geological Survey for three decades in the Far West, largely own success".

== Gallery ==
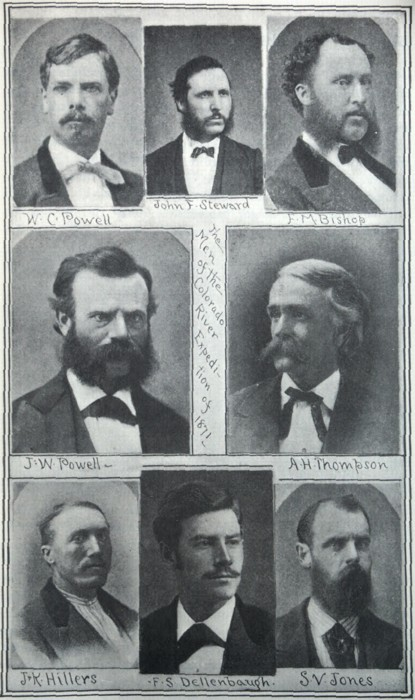
Members of Powell's Second Expedition

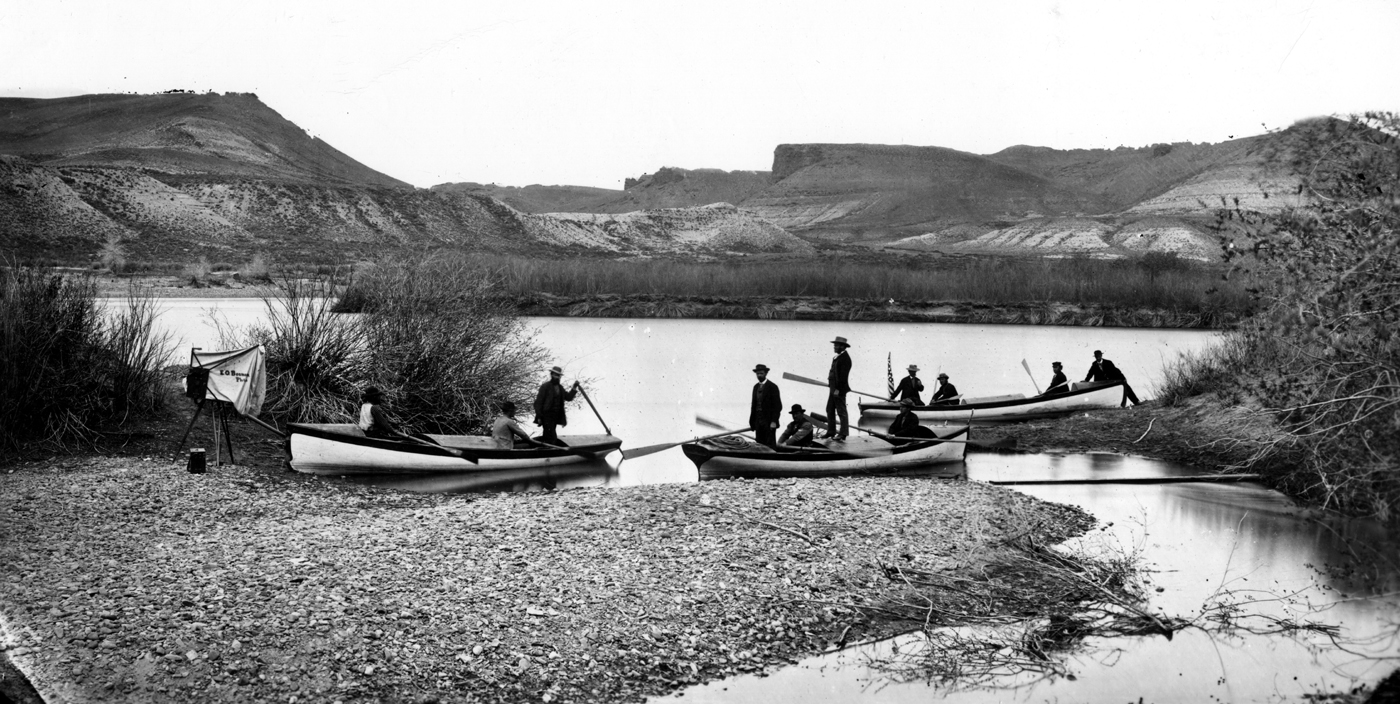
Powell Party, 1871

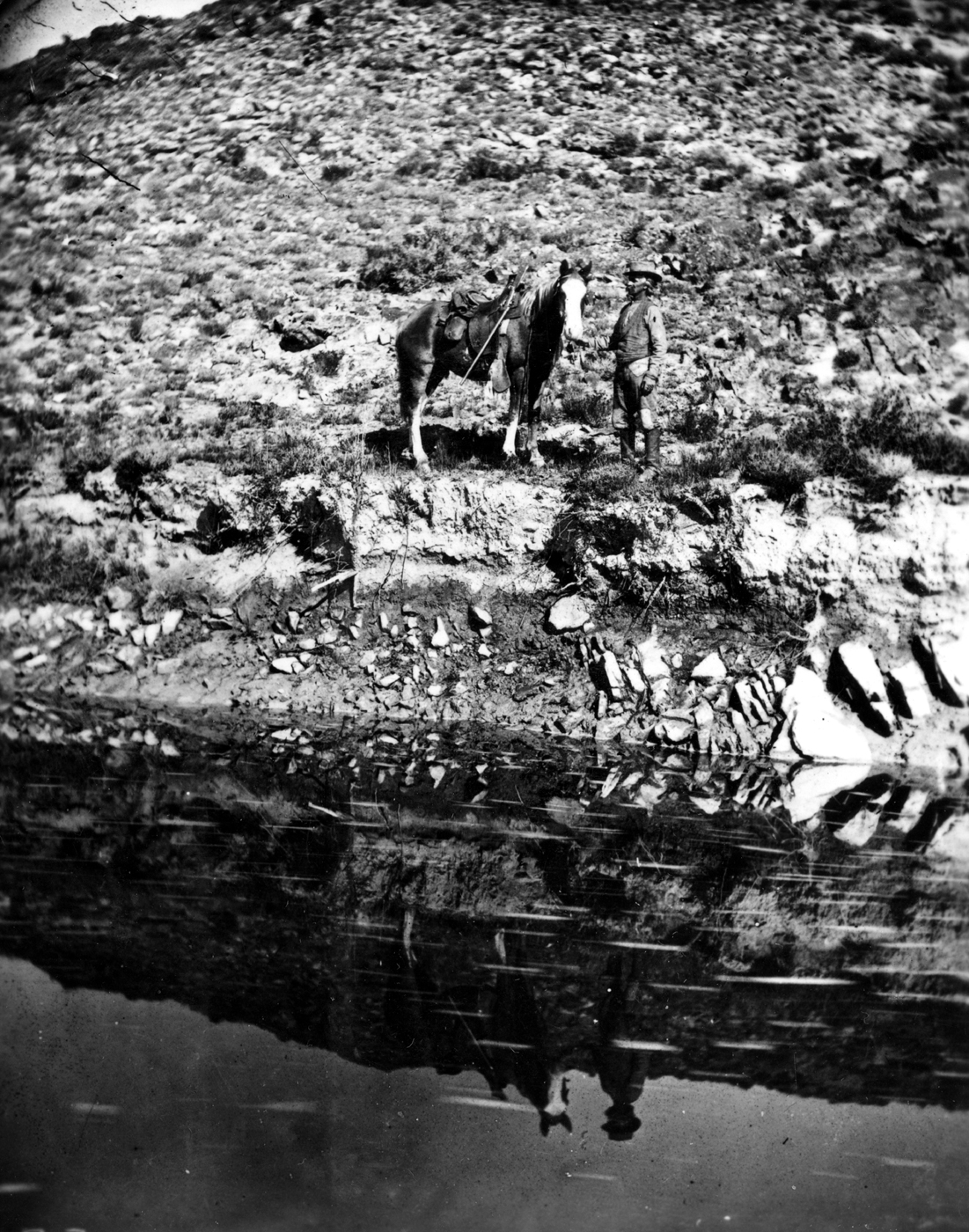
Almon Harris Thompson and his horse, Ute in 1872

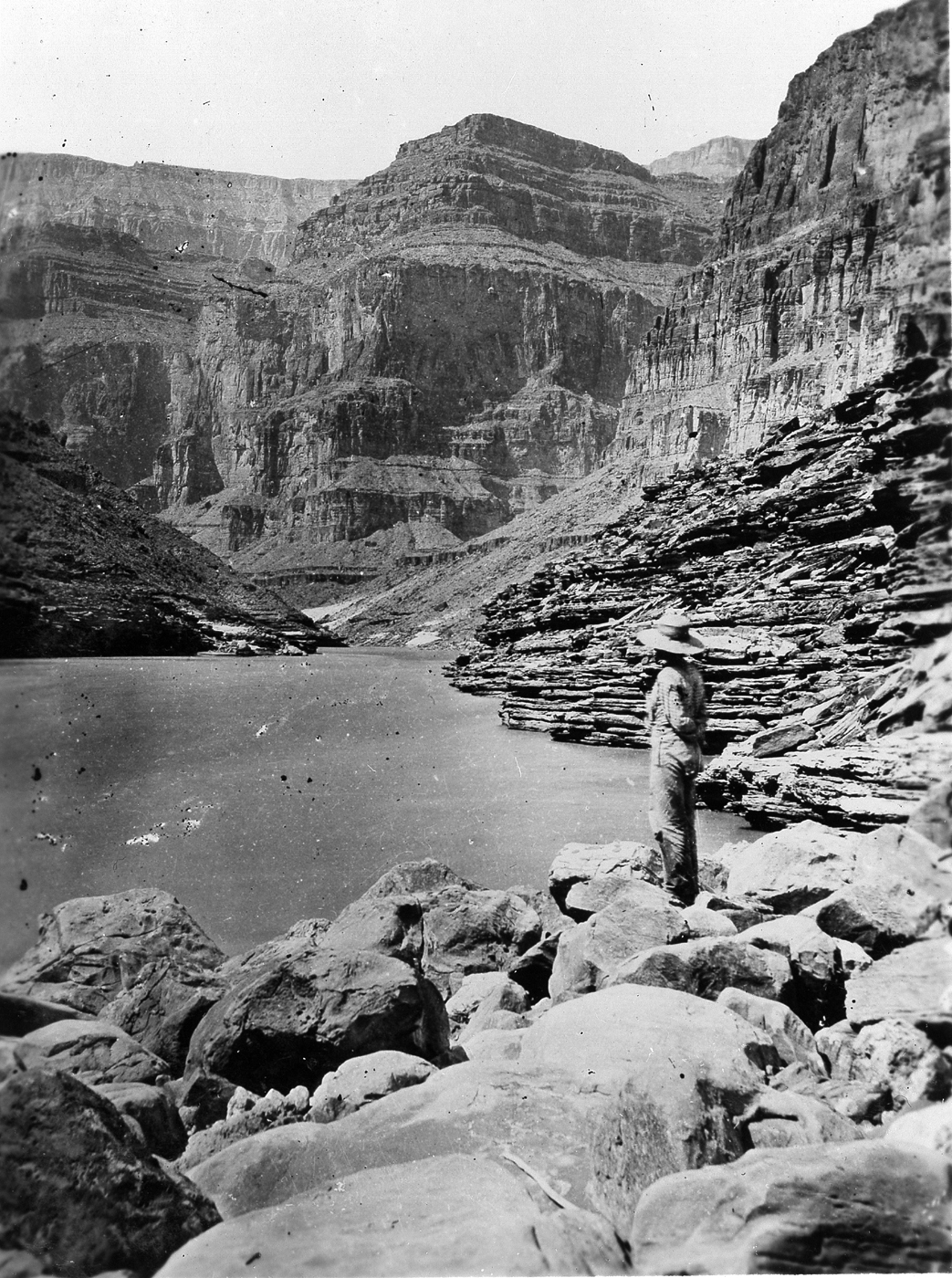
Almon Harris Thompson at the Grand Canyon in 1872

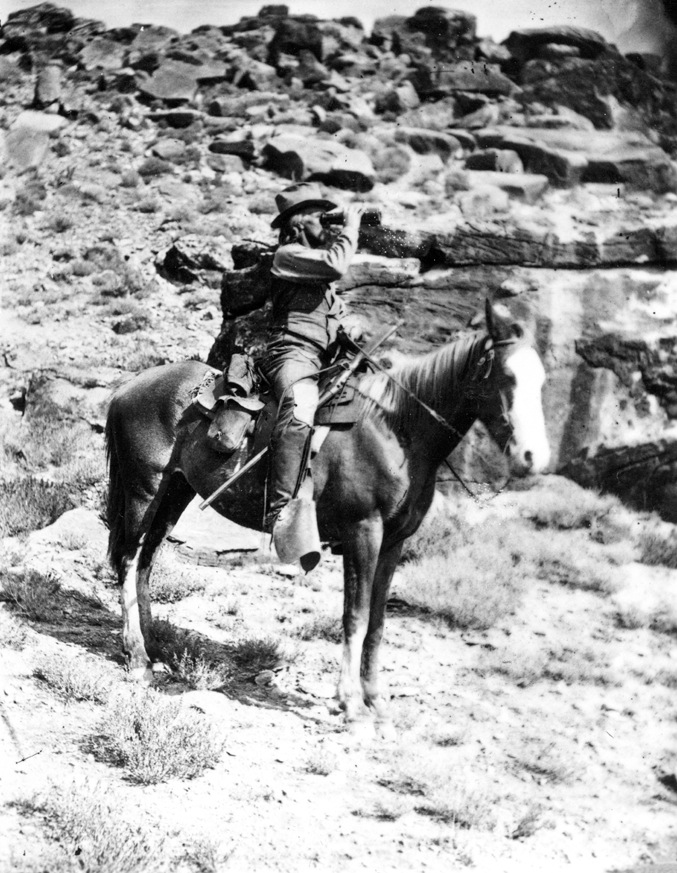
Almon Harris Thompson and his horse, Ute in 1872
