= Henry Mountains =

Mountain range in Utah, United States

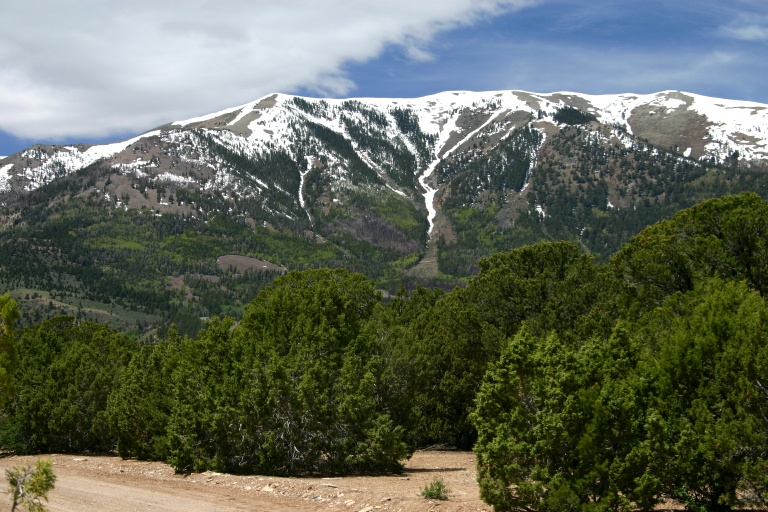
- Peaks in the Henry Mountains viewed from a high mountain road

Highest point
- Peak: Mount Ellen
- Elevation: 11,522 ft (3,512 m)
- Coordinates: 38°6.53′N 110°48.82′W

Geography
- Location within Utah
- Country: United States
- State: Utah
- Range coordinates: 37°56′36″N 110°41′56″W
- Parent range: Rocky Mountains

Geology
- Rock type: igneous

The Henry Mountains is a mountain range located in the southeastern portion of the U.S. state of Utah that runs in a generally north-south direction, extending over a distance of about 30 miles (48 km). They were named by Almon Thompson in honor of Joseph Henry, the first secretary of the Smithsonian Institution. The nearest towns are Bicknell, Torrey, and Hanksville, which are north of the mountains. The Henry Mountains were the last mountain range to be added to the map of the 48 contiguous U.S. states (1872), and before their official naming by Thompson were sometimes referred to as the "Unknown Mountains." In Navajo, the range is still referred to as Dził Bizhiʼ Ádiní ("mountain whose name is missing").

Most lands within the Henry Mountains are federally owned, public lands administered by the U.S. Bureau of Land Management. A herd of 350 American bison roams freely in the Henrys.

== Geography and geology ==
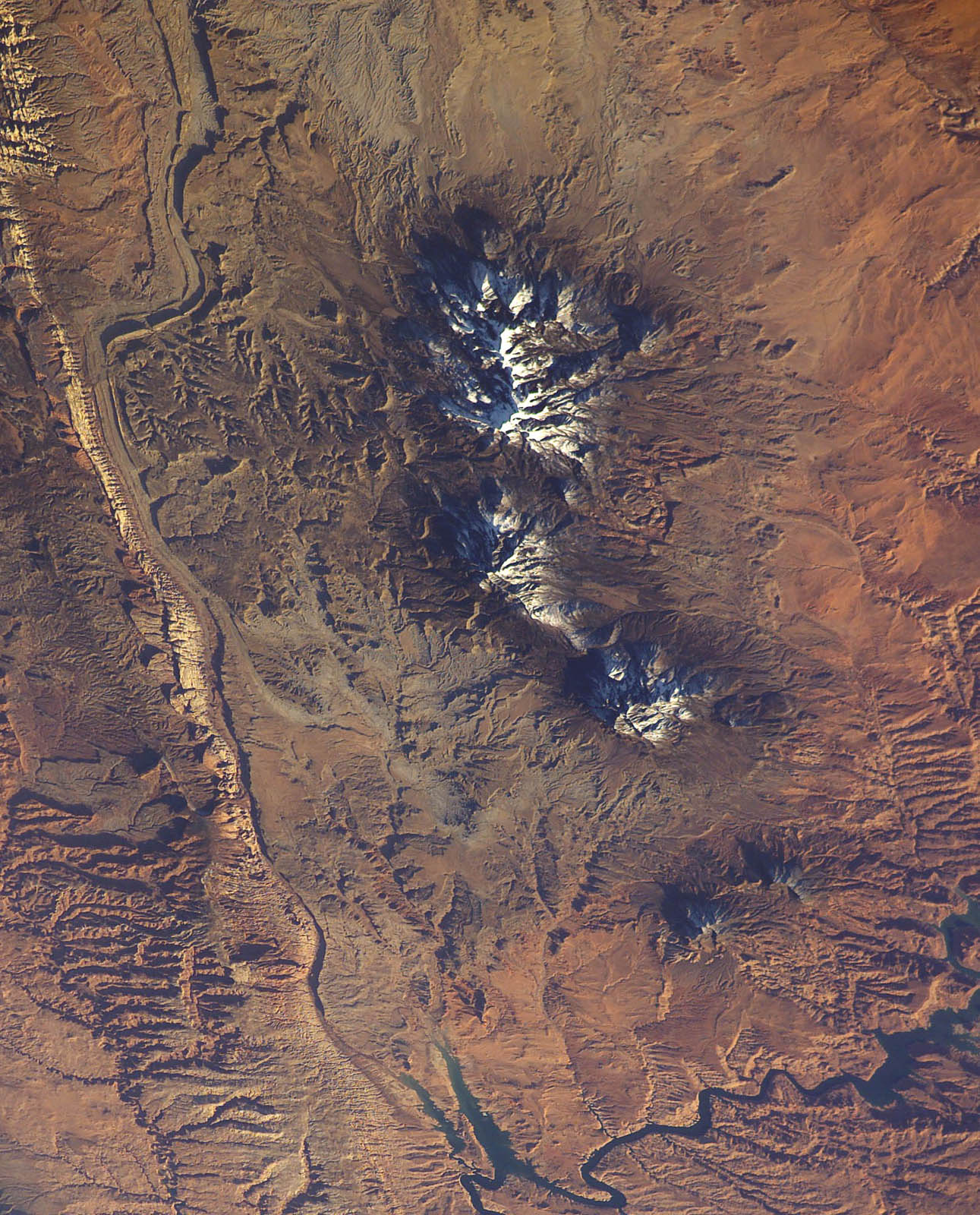
The Henry Mountains dominate the center of this view, a lower-resolution, cropped image from the Image Science & Analysis Laboratory, NASA Johnson Space Center. Lake Powell and the Colorado River are to the south, and the Waterpocket Fold is to the west.

The range is clustered into two main groups, with Highway 276 dividing the two portions. The northern group is by far the higher and larger in area of the two with Mount Ellen (11,522 ft; 3,512 m), Mount Pennell (11,371 ft; 3,466 m), and Mount Hillers (10,723 ft; 3,268 m). The southern group is much lower in elevation. The southern group has two peaks: Mount Ellsworth (8,235 ft; 2,510 m) and Mount Holmes (8,000 ft; 2,400 m). The southern group is also known as the "Little Rockies".

The Henry Mountains are drained by several canyon systems which radiate away from the isolated range, flowing north into the Fremont River, east into the Dirty Devil River, or south into Lake Powell. Surface water is scarce in the Henrys. Precipitation is about 6 inches (150 mm) annually at an elevation of 5,000 feet (1,500 m) at the foot of the mountains, increasing to about 15 inches (380 mm) at 7,000 feet (2,100 m) elevation and then diminishing to about 13 inches (330 mm) at the highest elevations.

The geology of these mountains was first studied in 1875-1876 by Grove Karl Gilbert. He coined the term "laccolite" (now laccolith) to describe the characteristic shapes of some of the igneous intrusions that core the mountains. The main type of igneous rock is porphyritic diorite. This continues to be a unique area of study for geologists who focus on intrusion emplacement processes, since the near-horizontal sedimentary strata are clearly folded to accommodate the magma.

The ages of igneous rocks are important for understanding the evolution of the Colorado Plateau. The ages of these rocks measured by potassium–argon dating between 1969 and 1990 were discordant, ranging from 25 to 45 million years. However, uranium–lead dating of zircon, argon–argon dating of hornblende, and fission track dating have yielded consistent ages of about 23 to 31 million years. The intrusions are hosted by Permian to Cretaceous sedimentary rocks. The geology of these mountains is similar to the geology of the La Sal Range and of the Abajo Mountains, both also on the Colorado Plateau in southeastern Utah.

== History ==
The Henry Mountains were sparsely occupied by Native Americans for thousands of years before the arrival of the first White settlers. The first exploration of the Henrys was in spring 1872 by Almon Harris Thompson, who climbed and named the highest summit in the Henrys after his wife Ellen. Several Mormon settlements, usually ephemeral, were established during the 1880s. In the 1890s the Henrys experienced several gold rushes of short duration. In about 1900, ranchers introduced large herds of sheep. By the 1930s, the Henrys were heavily overgrazed by sheep, causing erosion and damaging native vegetation. The Taylor Grazing Act of 1934 curtailed most of the overgrazing. A 2015 report identified only a few small areas still impacted by overgrazing, and vegetation cover had improved in most areas.

"The conditions of aridity, isolation, and rugged surroundings . . . have always kept settlement and development in the Henry Mountains to a minimum . . . . The landscape is just too harsh, the distances too vast."

== Bison ==
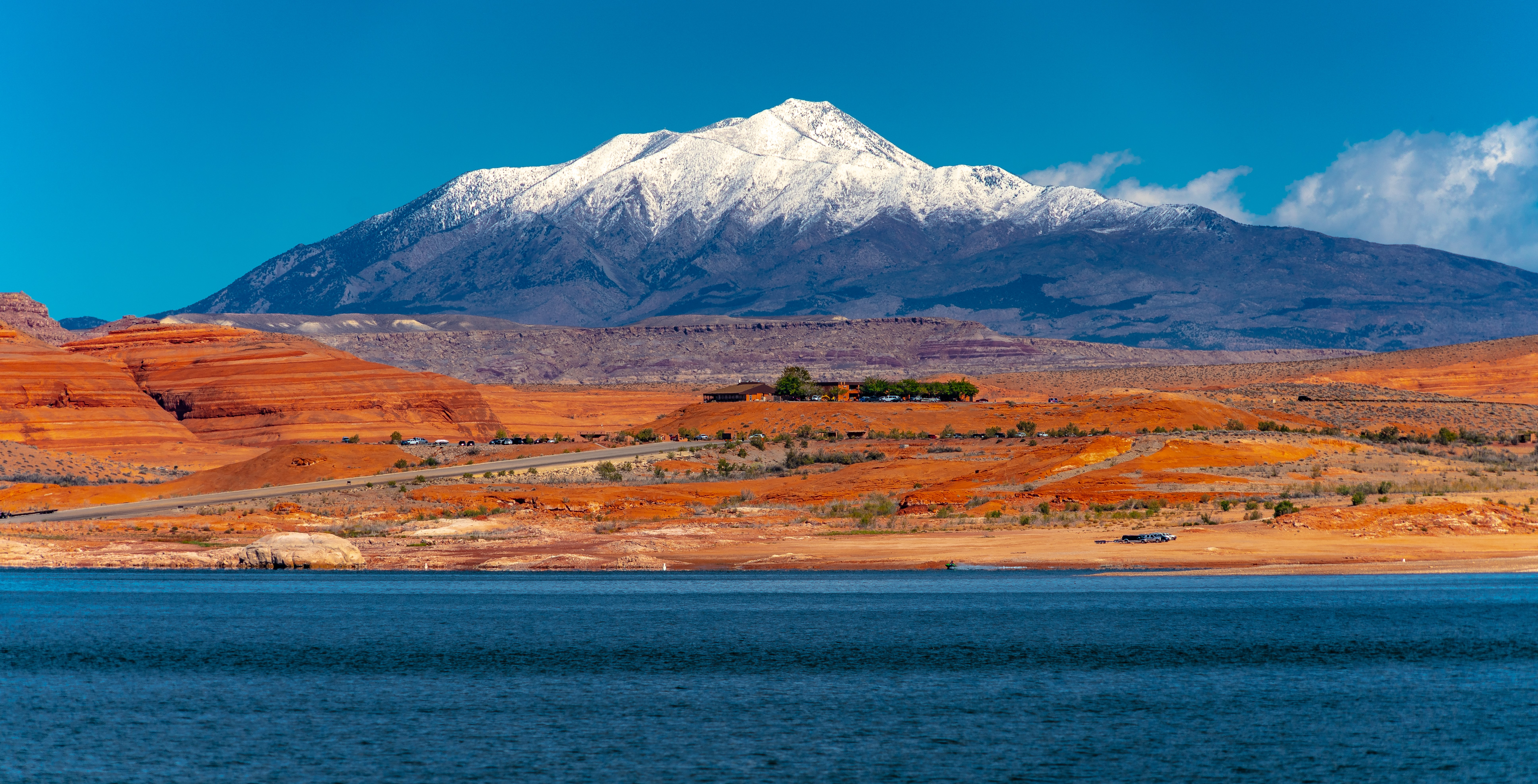
Mt. Pennell as seen from Lake Powell.

The Henry Mountains are home to approximately 350 American bison. Via genetic testing of mitochondrial and nuclear DNA, the Henry Mountains bison herd is one of only three free-roaming and genetically purebred bison herds on public lands in the United States. This study, published in 2015, also showed the Henry Mountains bison to be free of brucellosis, a bacterial disease that was imported with non-native domestic cattle to North America. The other two American herds are in Yellowstone National Park and Wind Cave National Park in South Dakota. The majority of free-ranging American Bison (approximately 90%) are found in Alberta, British Columbia, Yukon, and the Northwest Territories, with additional populations in Alaska transplanted from Canada in 2008.

The Henry Mountains Bison Herd was created in 1941 when 18 bison, including three bulls, were moved from Yellowstone National Park and released near the Dirty Devil River, south and east of Hanksville, Utah. An additional five bulls were added to the population in 1942. The herd has gradually moved toward the Henry Mountains, frequenting elevations up to 10,000 feet (3,000 m). The Henry Mountain herd has been brucellosis-free since 1963.

Utah wildlife biologists set a population objective of 325 bison by 2012 for the Henry Mountain herd. As bison reproduce rapidly and the herds have been larger than this in the past, a decision was made to reduce the size of the herd. To achieve this objective and increase overall genetic diversity, breeding animals are transplanted from the herd to other locations. In January 2008, Utah Division of Wildlife Resources officials transplanted 31 animals to the Book Cliffs in eastern Utah. The new group joined 14 animals previously released in August, 2008 from a private herd on the nearby Uintah and Ouray Indian Reservation. In addition, special licenses are issued annually to hunt the animals and help reduce the excess population. In 2009, 146 public once-in-a-lifetime Henry Mountain bison hunting permits were issued.

== Management ==
Much of the area is managed by the United States Bureau of Land Management.
