= Mount Ellen (Utah) =

Mountain in the American state of Utah

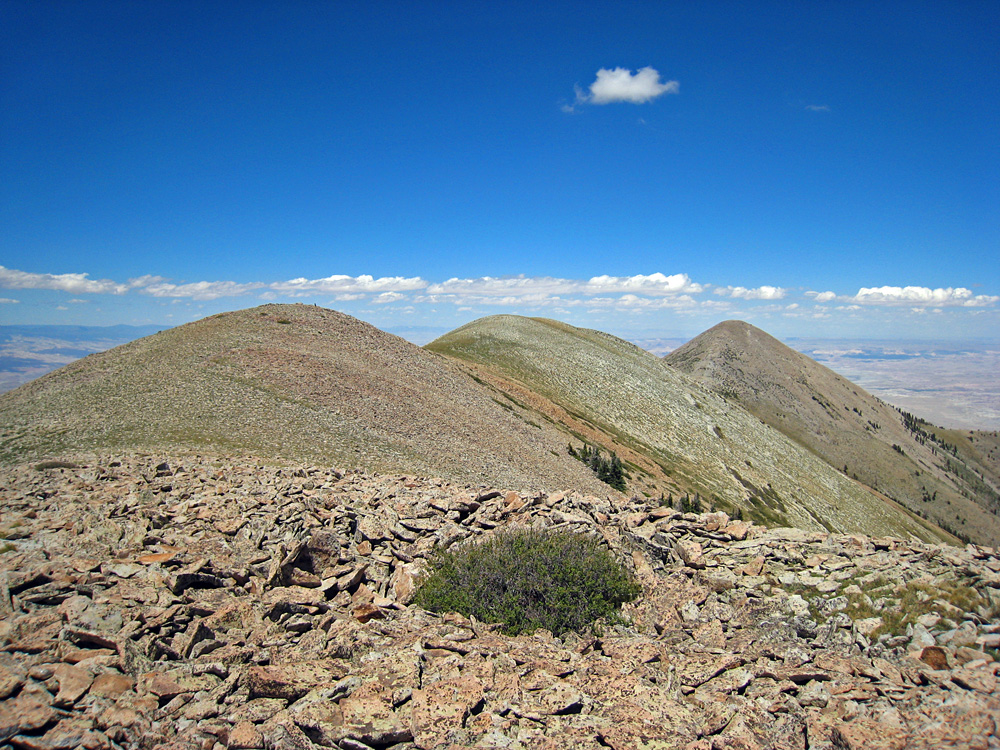
- Mount Ellen Ridge

Highest point
- Elevation: 11,527 ft (3,513 m) NAVD 88
- Prominence: 5,842 ft (1,781 m)
- Listing: US most prominent peaks 72nd; Utah county high points 12th
- Coordinates: 38°06′35″N 110°48′50″W

Naming
- Etymology: Ellen Powell Thompson

Geography
- Location within Utah
- Location: Garfield County, Utah, U.S.
- Parent range: Henry Mountains
- Topo map: USGS Mount Ellen

Mount Ellen is a mountain located in Garfield County, Utah, United States.

== Description ==
Mount Ellen's North Summit Ridge is the highest point in the Henry Mountains; it is also the highest point in Garfield County. It can be reached by a short hike from an unpaved road. These mountains were the last to be surveyed by the USGS in the lower 48 states. The mountain can be seen from as far as Mount Peale in the La Sal Mountains of eastern Utah.

Mount Ellen is an ultra prominent peak, meaning that it has more than 1,500 metres (4,921 ft) of topographic prominence, standing out considerably from nearby mountains. It stands in the watershed of the Fremont River, which together with Muddy Creek forms the Dirty Devil River, which drains into the Colorado River, and ultimately into the Gulf of California in Mexico.

The Paiute name for Mount Ellen was Un tar re. It was also referred to as First Mountain. After climbing to the summit in June 1872, Almon Harris Thompson named it for his wife Ellen. Ellen Powell Thompson was also the sister of explorer John Wesley Powell.

Over several days beginning on September 10, 1895, a detachment of the U.S. Army Signal Corps established the world heliograph record from stations atop Mount Ellen, Utah and Mount Uncompahgre, Colorado. The record for visual signaling was established utilizing mirrors 8 inches across and telescopes. The flashing signals communicated over a distance of 183 miles.

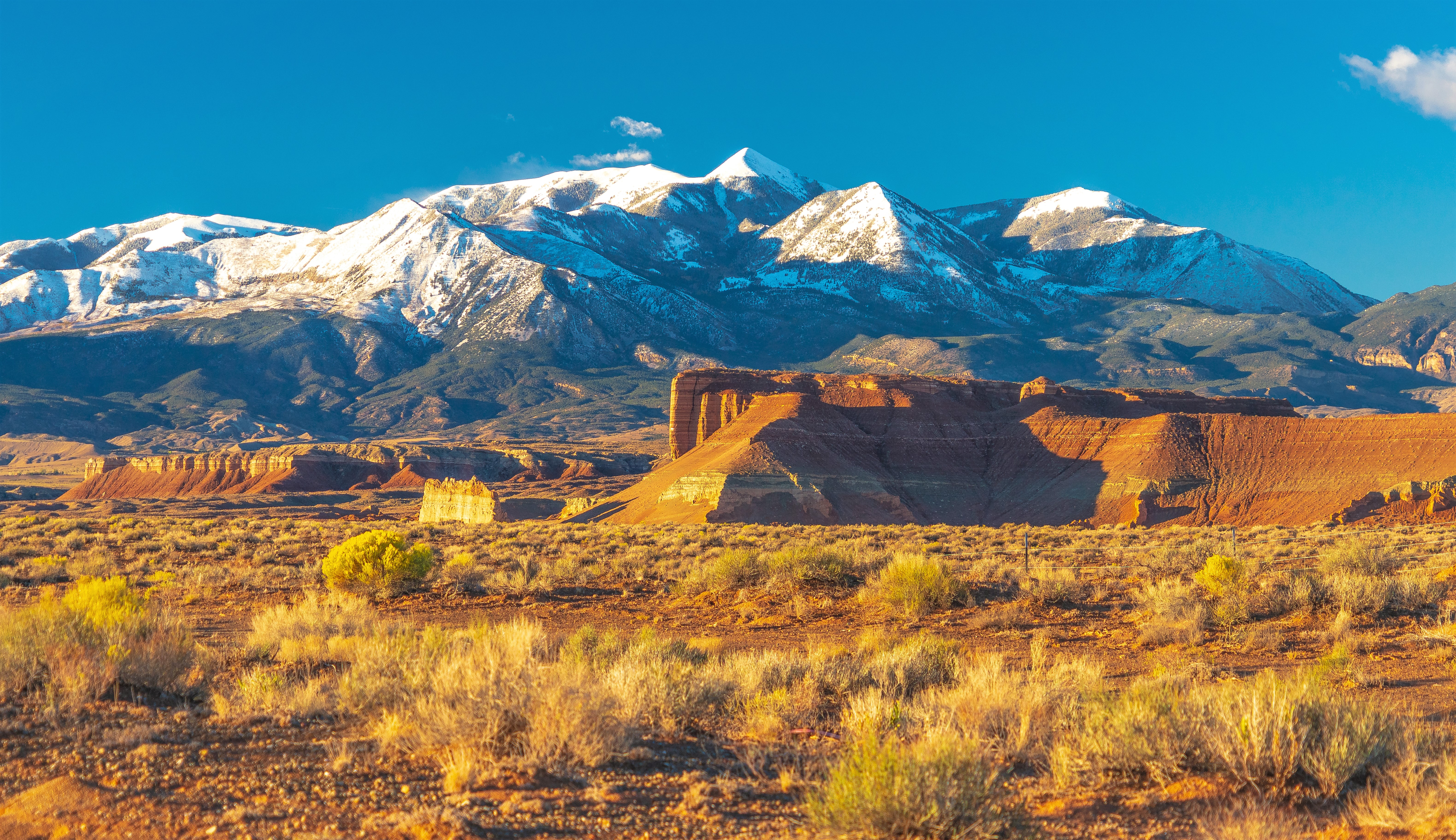
Mount Ellen from Highway 95

== See also ==
- List of mountains in Utah
- List of Ultras of the United States
