= Laccolith =

Mass of igneous rock formed from magma

Cross section of a laccolith intruding into and deforming strata

A laccolith is a body of intrusive rock with a dome-shaped upper surface and a level base, fed by a conduit from below. A laccolith forms when magma (molten rock) rising through the Earth's crust begins to spread out horizontally, prying apart the host rock strata. The pressure of the magma is high enough that the overlying strata are forced upward, giving the laccolith its dome-like form.

Over time, erosion can expose the solidified laccolith, which is typically more resistant to weathering than the host rock. The exposed laccolith then forms a hill or mountain. The Henry Mountains of Utah, US, are an example of a mountain range composed of exposed laccoliths. Geologist Grove Karl Gilbert carried out pioneering field work on this type of intrusion there. Laccolith mountains have since been identified in many other parts of the world.

Basic types of intrusions: 1. Laccolith; 2. Small dike; 3. Batholith; 4. Dike; 5. Sill; 6. Volcanic neck, pipe; 7. Lopolith; Note: As a general rule, in contrast to the smoldering volcanic vent in the figure, these names refer to the fully cooled and usually millions-of-years-old rock formations, which are the result of the underground magmatic activity shown.

== Description ==
A laccolith is a type of igneous intrusion, formed when magma forces its way upwards through the Earth's crust, but cools and solidifies before reaching the surface. Laccoliths are distinguished from other igneous intrusions by their dome-shaped upper surface and level base. They are assumed to be fed by a conduit from below, though this is rarely exposed. When the host rock is volcanic, the laccolith is referred to as a cryptodome. Laccoliths form only at relatively shallow depth in the crust, usually from intermediate composition magma, though laccoliths of all compositions from silica-poor basalt to silica-rich rhyolite are known.

A laccolith forms after an initial sheet-like intrusion has been injected between layers of sedimentary rock. If the intrusion remains limited in size, it forms a sill, in which the strata above and below the intrusion remain parallel to each other and the intrusion remains sheetlike. The intrusion begins to lift and dome the overlying strata only if the radius of the intrusion exceeds a critical radius, which is roughly:

$$r \ge \frac{2T\tau}{P_m-P_l}$$

where $P_m$ is the pressure of the magma, $P_l$ is the lithostatic pressure (weight of the overlying rock), $T$ is the thickness of the overlying rocks, and $\tau$ is the shear strength of the overlying rock. For example, in the Henry Mountains of Utah, geologist Grove Karl Gilbert found in 1877 that sills were always less than 1 km^{2} (0.4 sq mi) in area, while laccoliths were always greater than 1 km^{2} in area. From this, Gilbert concluded that sills were forerunners of laccoliths. Laccoliths formed from sills only when they became large enough for the pressure of the magma to force the overlying strata to dome upwards. Gilbert also determined that larger laccoliths formed at greater depth. Both laccoliths and sills are classified as concordant intrusions, since the bulk of the intrusion does not cut across host rock strata, but intrudes between them.

More recent studies of laccoliths have confirmed Gilbert's basic conclusions, while refining the details. Both sills and laccoliths have blunt rather than wedgelike edges, and sills of the Henry Mountains are typically up to 10 m (33 ft) thick, while laccoliths are up to 200 m (660 ft) thick. The periphery of a laccolith may be smooth, but it may also have finger-like projections consistent with Rayleigh-Taylor instability of the magma pushing along the strata. An example of a fingered laccolith is the Shonkin Sag laccolith in Montana, US. The critical radius for the sill to laccolith transition is now thought to be affected the viscosity of the magma (being greater for less viscous magma), as well as the strength of the host rock. A modern formula for the shape of a laccolith is:

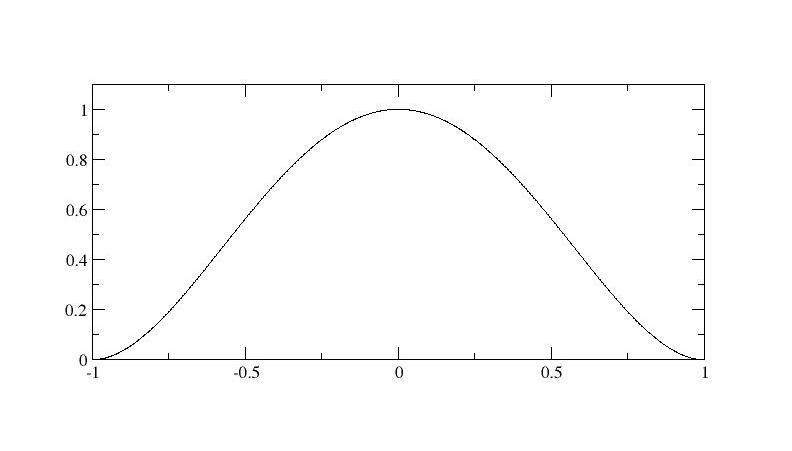
Idealized laccolith shape

$$z = \frac{3(P_m-\rho_cgT)}{16BT^3}(r_0^2-r^2)^2$$

where $z$ is the height of the laccolith roof, $g$ is the acceleration of gravity, $B$ is the elastic modulus of the host rock, $r$ is the horizontal distance from the center of the laccolith, and $r_0$ is the outer radius of the laccolith. Because of their greater thickness, which slows the cooling rate, the rock of laccoliths is usually coarser-grained than the rock of sills.

The growth of laccoliths can take as little as a few months when associated with a single magma injection event, or up to hundreds or thousands of years by multiple magmatic pulses stacking sills on top of each other and deforming the host rock incrementally.

Over time, erosion can form small hills and even mountains around a central peak, since the intrusive rock is usually more resistant to weathering than the host rock. Because the emplacement of the laccolith domes up the overlying beds, local topographic relief is increased and erosion is accelerated, so that the overlying beds are eroded away to expose the intrusive cores.

== Etymology ==
The term was first applied as "laccolite" by Gilbert after his study of intrusions of diorite in Utah around 1875. The word "laccolith" derives from Ancient Greek λάκκος (lákkos), meaning "cistern", and λίθος (líthos), meaning "stone".

== Where laccoliths form ==
Laccoliths tend to form at relatively shallow depths and in some cases are formed by relatively viscous magmas, such as those that crystallize to diorite, granodiorite, and granite. In those cases, cooling underground may take place slowly, giving time for larger crystals to form in the cooling magma. In other cases less viscous magma such as shonkinite may form phenocrysts of augite at depth, then inject through a vertical feeder dike that ends in a laccolith.

Sheet intrusions tend to form perpendicular to the direction of least stress in the country rock they intrude. Thus, laccoliths are characteristic of regions where the crust is being compressed and the direction of least stress is vertical, while areas where the crust is in tension are more likely to form dikes, since the direction of least stress is then horizontal. For example, the laccoliths of the Ortiz porphyry belt in New Mexico likely formed during Laramide compression of the region 33 to 36 million years ago. When Laramide compression was later replaced by extension, emplacement of sills and laccoliths was replaced by emplacement of dikes. Dating of the intrusions has helped determine the point in geologic time when compression was replaced with extension.

== Examples ==
In addition to the Henry Mountains, laccolith mountains are found on the nearby Colorado Plateau in the La Sal Mountains and Abajo Mountains.

The filled and solidified magma chamber of Torres del Paine (Patagonia) is one of the best exposed laccoliths, built up incrementally by horizontal granitic and mafic magma intrusions over 162 ± 11 thousand years. Horizontal sheeted intrusions were fed by vertical intrusions.

The small Barber Hill syenite-stock laccolith in Charlotte, Vermont, has several volcanic trachyte dikes associated with it. Molybdenite is also visible in outcrops on this exposed laccolith. In Big Bend Ranch State Park, at the southwesternmost visible extent of the Ouachita orogeny, lies the Solitario. It consists of the eroded remains of a laccolith, presumably named for the sense of solitude that observers within the structure might have, due to the partial illusion of endless expanse in all directions.

One of the largest laccoliths in the United States is Pine Valley Mountain in the Pine Valley Mountain Wilderness area near St. George, Utah.

A system of laccoliths is exposed on the Italian island of Elba, which form a "Christmas tree" laccolith system in which a single igneous plumbing system has produced multiple laccoliths at different levels in the crust.

== Problems reconstructing shapes of intrusions ==
The original shape of intrusions can be difficult to reconstruct. For instance, Devils Tower in Wyoming and Needle Rock in Colorado were both thought to be volcanic necks, but further study has suggested they are eroded laccoliths. At Devils Tower, intrusion would have had to cool very slowly so as to form the slender pencil-shaped columns of phonolite porphyry seen today. However, erosion has stripped away the overlying and surrounding rock, so it is impossible to reconstruct the original shape of the igneous intrusion, which may or may not be the remnant of a laccolith. At other localities, such as in the Henry Mountains and other isolated mountain ranges of the Colorado Plateau, some intrusions demonstrably have the classic shapes of laccoliths.

== Extraterrestrial laccoliths ==
Many examples of possible laccoliths can be seen on the surface of the Moon. Some are centered in impact craters and may form as part of the postimpact evolution of the crater. Others are located along possible faults or fissures. Laccoliths on the Moon are much wider but thinner than those on Earth, due to the Moon's lower gravity and more fluid magmatism.

Possible laccoliths have also been identified on Mars, in western Arcadia Planitia.

== Gallery ==
Dolerite intrusion laccolith in Sydney, Australia

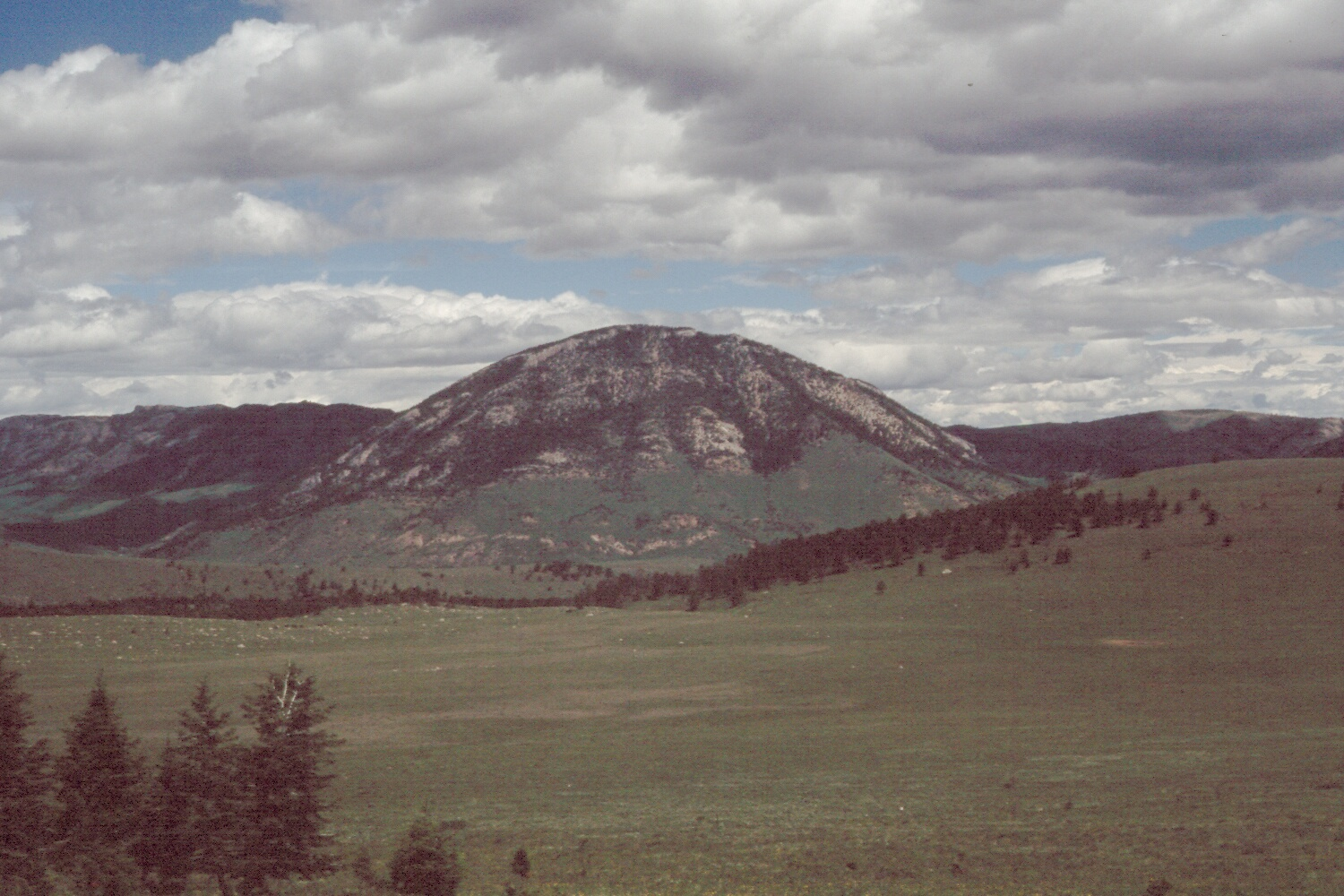
Laccolith exposed by erosion of overlying strata in Montana

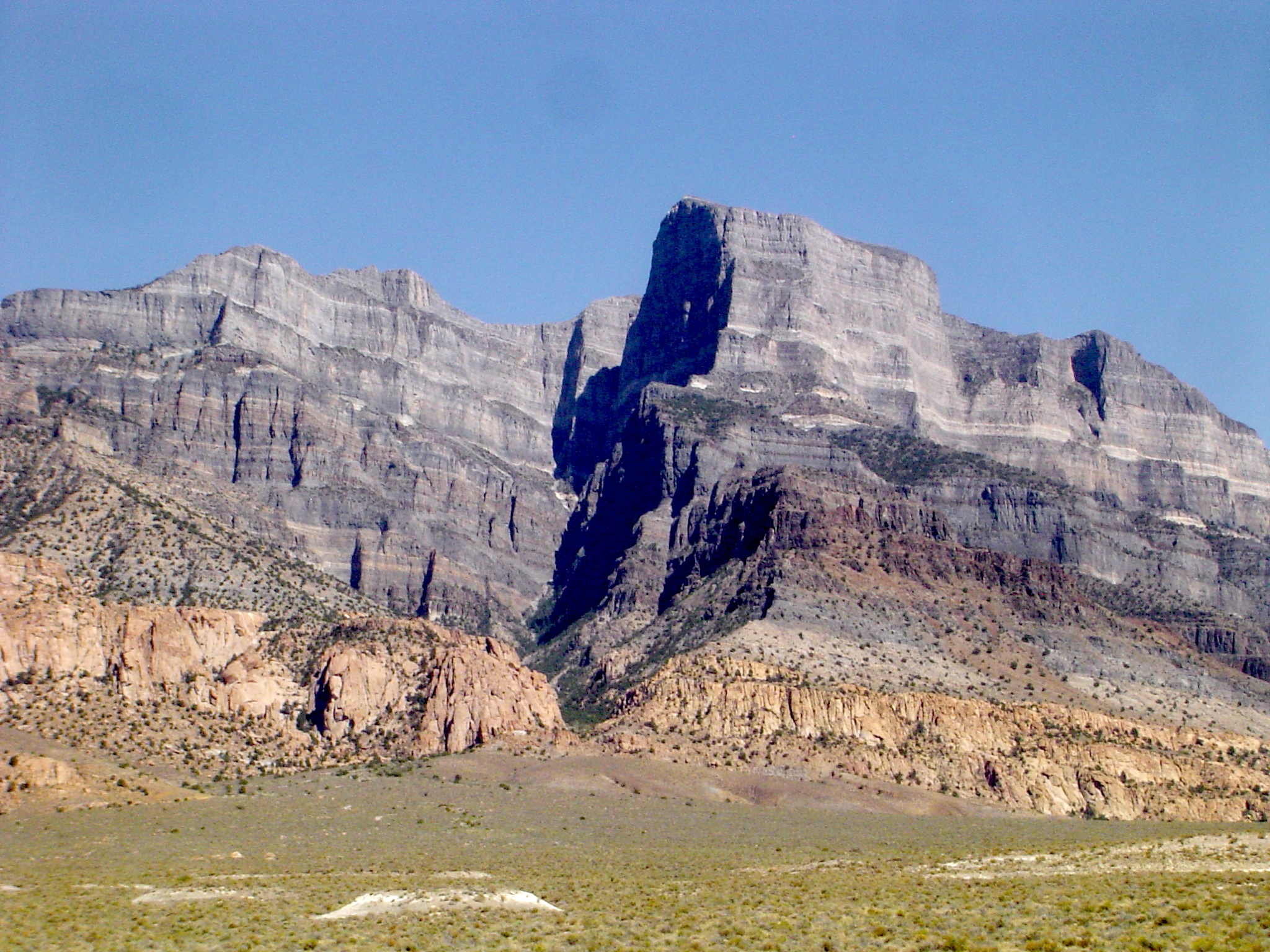
Pink monzonite laccolith intrudes within the grey Cambrian and Ordovician strata near Notch Peak, Utah

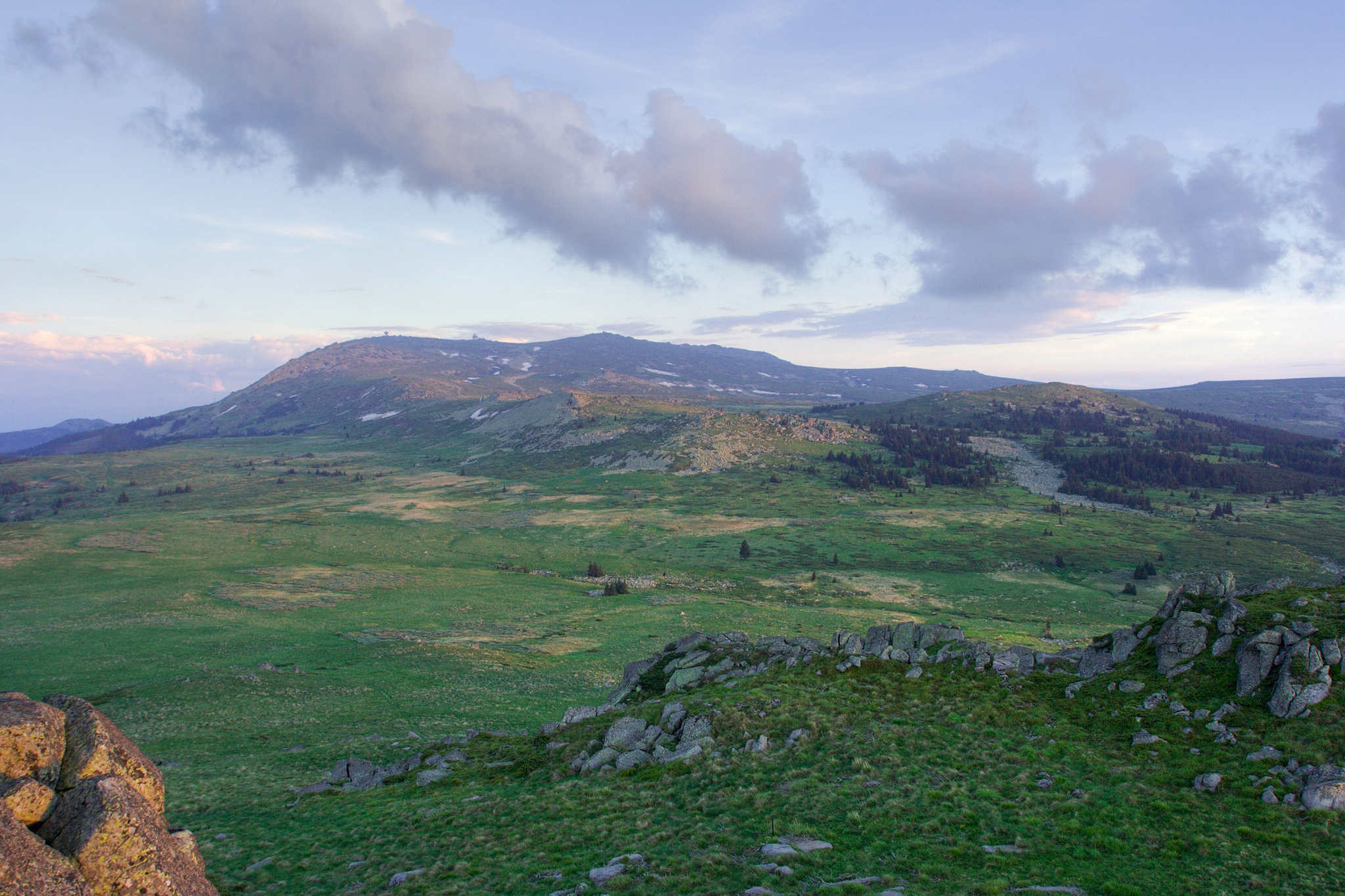
The eroded laccolith on the top of Vitosha - the domed mountain next to Sofia, Bulgaria

== See also ==
- Batholith – Large igneous rock intrusion
- Lopolith – Lenticular igneous intrusion with a depressed central region
- Stock – Smaller igneous intrusion
