= Anasazi (disambiguation) =

Anasazi is a term, now seen as derogatory, to refer to Pueblo peoples, an ancient yet enduring Native American culture in the Southwestern United States, as well as the Ancestral Puebloans.

Anasazi may also refer to:

- Virgin Anasazi, the westernmost Ancient Pueblo group
- "Anasazi" (The X-Files), an episode of The X-Files
- Tyr Anasazi, a character from the television series Gene Roddenberry's Andromeda
