= Basketmaker culture =

Pre-Ancestral Puebloan period

Map of Ancient Pueblo People in the American Southwest and Northern Mexico.

The Basketmaker culture of the pre-Ancestral Puebloans began about 1500 BCE and continued until about 750 CE with the beginning of the Pueblo I Era. This prehistoric culture of Oasisamerica was named "Basketmaker" for the large number of baskets found at archaeological sites of 3,000 to 2,000 years ago.

== The people ==
Well-preserved mummies found in dry caves provide insight into the ancient Basketmakers. Women were about 5 feet tall and men were 3 to 4 inches taller. They had long, narrow faces and medium to stocky build. Their skin varied from light to dark brown and they had brown or black hair and eyes. Fancy hairstyles were sometimes worn by men and infrequently by women. Women's hair may have been cut short; Significant quantities of rope made of human hair have been recovered and since it was more likely that men had fancy hairstyles, the hair for rope may have come from women.

The Basketmakers wore sandals made of woven yucca fibers or strips of leaves. There is little evidence of clothing aside from a few loin-cloths found at archaeological sites. Women may have worn aprons on special occasions. Hides or blankets made of yucca fibers and rabbit fur were likely for warmth.

Both men and women wore necklaces, bracelets and pendants made of shell, stone, bone and dried berries. Shells, such as abalone, conus and olivella from the coast of the Pacific Ocean, would have been obtained through trade.

== Basketmaker eras ==
In the Early Basketmaker II Era people lived a semi-nomadic hunter-gatherer lifestyle with the introduction of cultivation of corn, which led to a more settled, agrarian life. Some of the early people lived in cave shelters in the San Juan River drainage. Excavation of their sites yielded a large number of baskets, for which they received their name, corn and evidence of human burials.

It was not until the Late Basketmaker II Era (about AD 50–500) that people lived in permanent dwellings, crude pit-houses made of brush, logs and earth. During the later portion of this period fired pottery was introduced to the Basketmakers, which due to regional and evolutionary differences greatly aided in dating and tracking pottery origins following archaeological excavations. Hunting became much easier during the Basketmaker III Era (about AD 500–750) when bow-and-arrow technology replaced the spear and atlatl used since the Archaic period of the Americas.

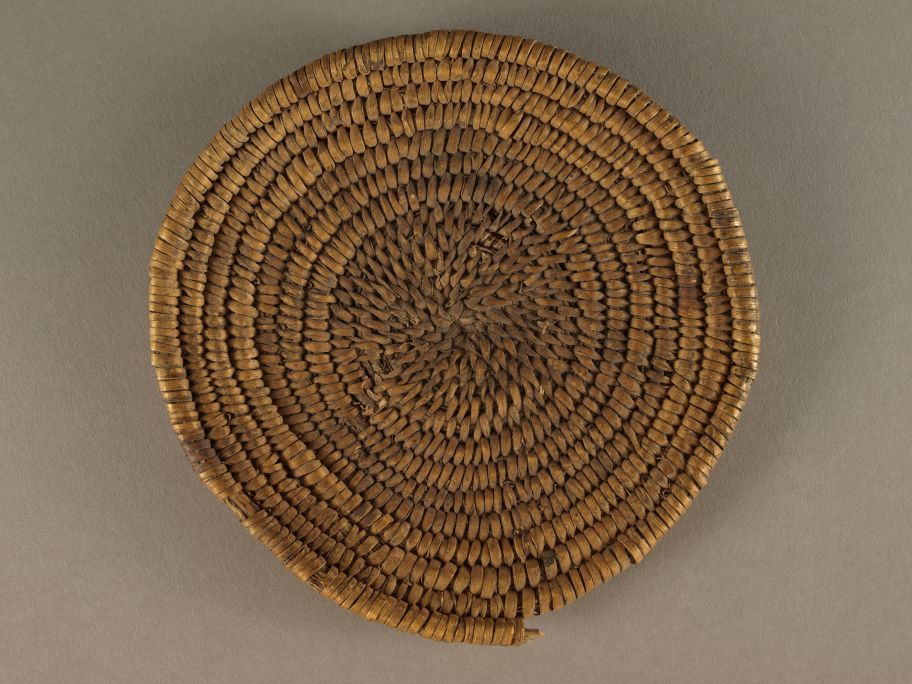
Basketmaker II "two rod and bundle" basket (ca AD 1 to 700), Zion National Park

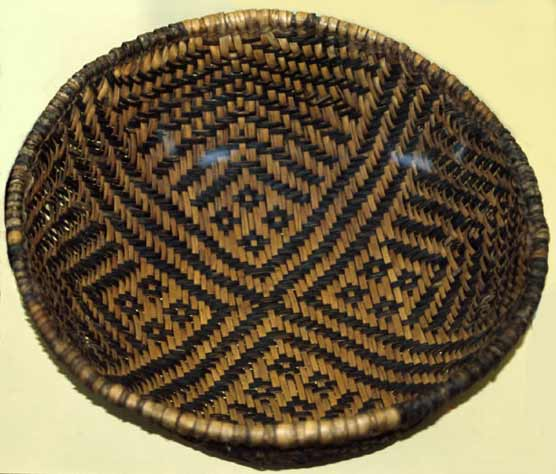
Basketmaker III basket (450–750 AD), Mesa Verde Museum

The following periods, the Pueblo Eras, saw the introduction of above-ground, multi-roomed masonry dwellings, more efficient stone tools, garments made of cotton or turkey feathers, and the introduction of the ceremonial kiva.

== Landscape and climate ==
Throughout the Ancestral Puebloan cultural eras, water was the most important resource. In the lowlands the climate was an arid land of juniper and sage. At about 6,000 feet (1,800 m) in elevation the climate was a moister land of pinyon trees.

== Cultural groups and periods ==
The cultural groups of this period include:

- Ancestral Puebloans – southern Utah, southern Colorado, northern Arizona and northern and central New Mexico.
- Hohokam – southern Arizona.
- Mogollon – southeastern Arizona, southern New Mexico and northern Mexico.
- Patayan – western Arizona, California and Baja California.
