= Early Basketmaker II period =

Ancient culture of the southwest United States

Map of Ancient Pueblo People in the American Southwest and Mexico

The Early Basketmaker II period (1500 BCE – 50 CE) was the first post-Archaic cultural period of ancient Pueblo people. The period began with the cultivation of maize in the northern American southwest, although there was not a dependence upon agriculture until about 500 BCE. It is preceded by the Archaic–Early Basketmaker period, and is followed by the Late Basketmaker II period.

== Basketmaker origin ==
The population of the Basketmaker people is likely not tied to one particular group of people, but reflective of the migration of agricultural people from the south and adoption of agriculture by local Archaic populations. For instance people on the Mogollon Rim of New Mexico had cultivated maize and adopted a less transitory lifestyle before the Early Basketmakers.

Projectile points, a basketry style known as "two rod and bundle", and other similarities existed between the Basketmakers II and the people of the San Pedro stage of the Cochise tradition.

To adopt the Basketmaker lifestyle, Archaic people would have adopted the cultivation of maize, a less mobile lifestyle and taken up residence in pit-houses. Other differences between the Archaic and Basketmaker cultures were the forms of basketry, symbols used in petroglyphs, burial practices and increase in traded items.

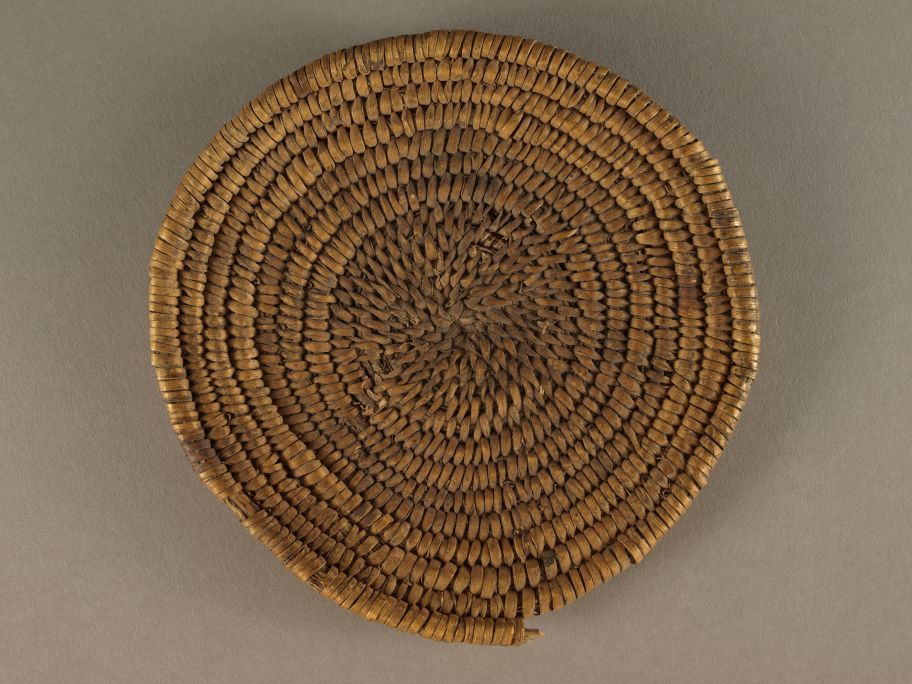
Basketmaker II "two rod and bundle" basket (c. 1 to 700 CE), Zion National Park

== Culture ==
The Early Basketmakers were primarily nomadic hunter gatherers for most of this period. They roamed the Colorado Plateau in small bands to collect ripe wild plants and hunted game. Roaming also put them in contact with other tribes with whom they socialized, traded, and sometimes inter-married. Cultivation of maize began about 500 BCE, which affected their mobility.

== Shelter ==
Dwellings of this period included caves and other shelters, often built below ground and lined with stone.

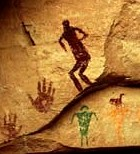
Pictograph, southeastern Utah, c. 1500 BCE Basketmaker culture

== Agriculture ==
Maize and squash were first cultivated more than 8,700 years ago in southwestern Mexico. Between 1000 and 2000 BCE maize and squash were found on the Colorado Plateau of the present United States. By 500 BCE maize was routinely cultivated and a major source of food in the Basketmakers' diet. Cultivating maize allowed the Basketmakers control over their food supply; They cultivated what they needed and stored surplus ground corn for later consumption. At first maize did not significantly modify their nomadic lifestyle. After the early Basketmakers planted the seed, they continued roaming for game and other wild foods. Just as they followed the seasonal growing cycles for wild plants, like pinyon nuts, they returned to harvest their crops when it was ripe for picking.

While they lived their nomadic lifestyle, though, the unattended crops were eaten by deer, birds, and rodents. This required the Basketmakers to stay by their crop and protect it until it was ready to be harvested. Once harvested, they created storage pits to protect the seeds for the following year's crops and surplus food from being eaten by insects and rodents. The pits were lined and covered with slabs of stone and bark and tightly sealed with adobe.

== Sites ==
The earliest pit-house dwelling (405–75 BCE) in southwestern Colorado is located on Sleeping Ute Mountain on the Ute Mountain Ute Tribe reservation (site 5MT10525). It had a hearth for cold weather, yet there was no evidence found of food cultivation. En Medio projectile points on the site that were of the Oshara tradition of the Archaic Southwest. Because it was a permanent or semi-permanent structure, the site may represent a precursor to the farming activities of the Early Basketmaker II.

== Basketry ==
The Basketmakers used a "two-rod and bundle" technique to make baskets from about 1 to 700 CE. The basket is made with bundles of thin, pliable twigs and yucca fibers. The bundles were coiled into a spiral pattern and sewn in place with strips of yucca leaves about 3 mm wide. Baskets were used to gather, store and cook food. The basket was made during the period when people were still semi-nomadic.

== Material goods ==
The Early Basketmakers' personal belongings included weapons, clothing, and baskets.

== Cultural groups and periods ==
The cultural groups of this period include:

- Ancestral Puebloans – southern Utah, southern Colorado, northern Arizona and northern and central New Mexico
- Hohokam – southern Arizona
- Mogollon – southeastern Arizona, southern New Mexico and northern Mexico
- Patayan – western Arizona, California and Baja California

== Notable Early Basketmaker II sites ==
- Petrified Forest National Park – Arizona
- Sleeping Ute Mountain – Colorado
- Virgin Anasazi – Colorado Plateau of Nevada, Utah and Arizona
- Zion National Park – Utah
