= Altar of Sacrifice =

Sandstone mountain in the state of Utah

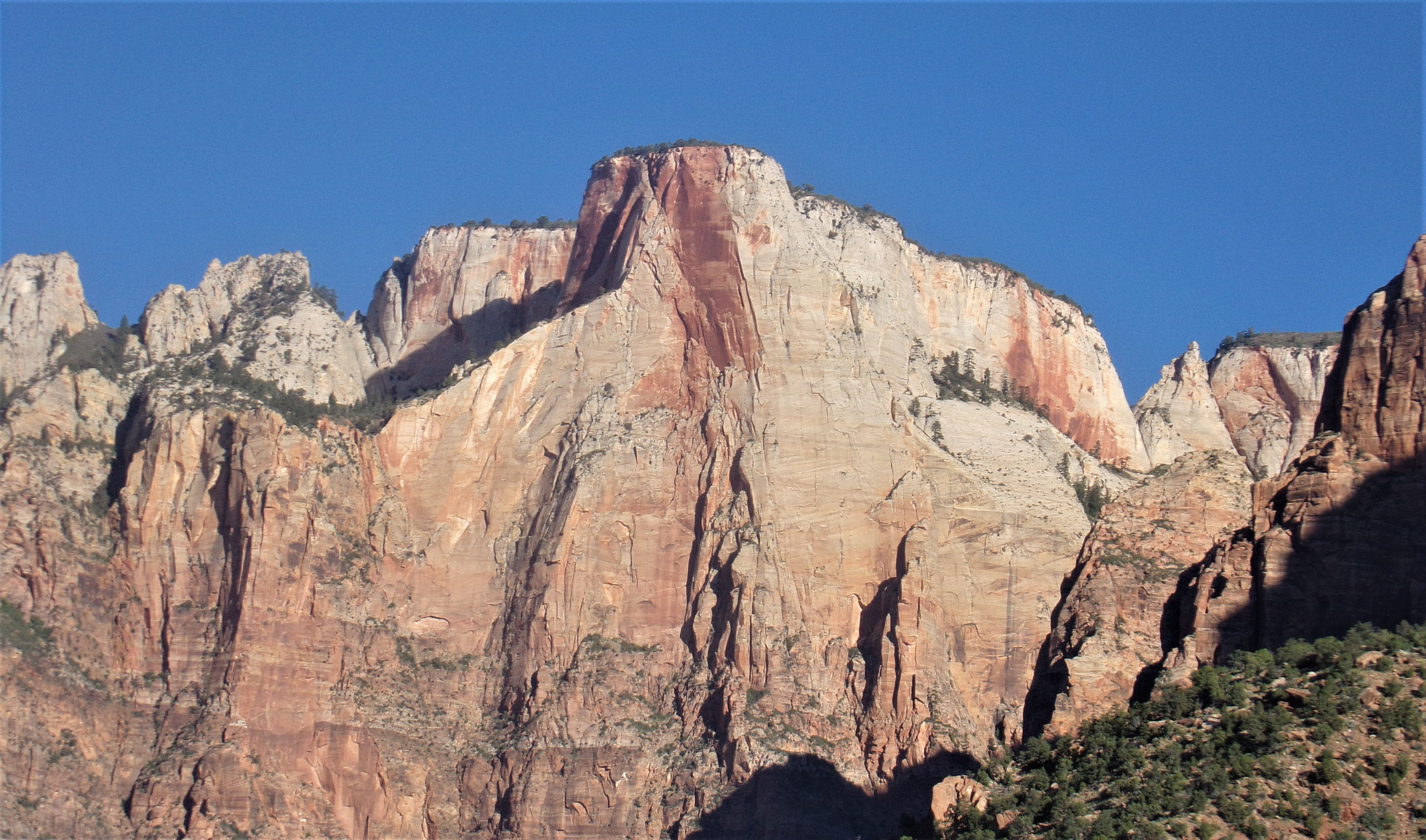
- Altar of Sacrifice, east aspect

Highest point
- Elevation: 7,505 ft (2,288 m)
- Prominence: 585 ft (178 m)
- Parent peak: The Sundial (7,590 ft)
- Isolation: 0.74 mi (1.19 km)
- Listing: Mountains of Utah
- Coordinates: 37°13′33″N 113°01′11″W

Geography
- Location within Utah Location within the United States
- Country: United States
- State: Utah
- County: Washington
- Protected area: Zion National Park
- Parent range: Colorado Plateau
- Topo map: USGS Springdale West

Geology
- Rock age: Jurassic
- Rock type: Navajo sandstone

Climbing
- Easiest route: class 5+ climbing

Altar of Sacrifice is a 7,505-foot (2,288 m) Navajo Sandstone mountain in Zion National Park in Washington County, Utah, United States, that is part of the Towers of the Virgin.

== Description ==
Altar of Sacrifice is situated 2.5 mi (4.0 km) west-northwest of Zion's park headquarters, towering 3,500 feet (1,100 m) above the floor of Zion Canyon and the Virgin River which drains precipitation runoff from this mountain. Its nearest higher neighbor is The West Temple, one mile (1.6 km) to the south. Other neighbors include The Witch Head, Meridian Tower, Bee Hive, The Sentinel, Mount Spry, Bridge Mountain, and Mount Kinesava.

== Etymology and naming ==
Altar of Sacrifice, The Great White Throne, and Angels Landing were named by Methodist Minister Frederick Vining Fisher from Ogden during a visit to Zion Canyon in 1916. This feature's name gained its appropriateness from dark red stains caused by hematite (iron oxide) that appear on the face of the east wall, as though great quantities of blood had been spilled from the top. Altar of Sacrifice's name was officially adopted in 1934 by the U.S. Board on Geographic Names.

== Climate ==
Spring and fall are the most favorable seasons to visit Altar of Sacrifice. According to the Köppen climate classification system, it is located in a Cold semi-arid climate zone, which is defined by the coldest month having an average mean temperature below 32 °F (0 °C), and at least 50% of the total annual precipitation being received during the spring and summer. This desert climate receives less than 10 inches (250 millimeters) of annual rainfall, and snowfall is generally light during the winter.

== Gallery ==
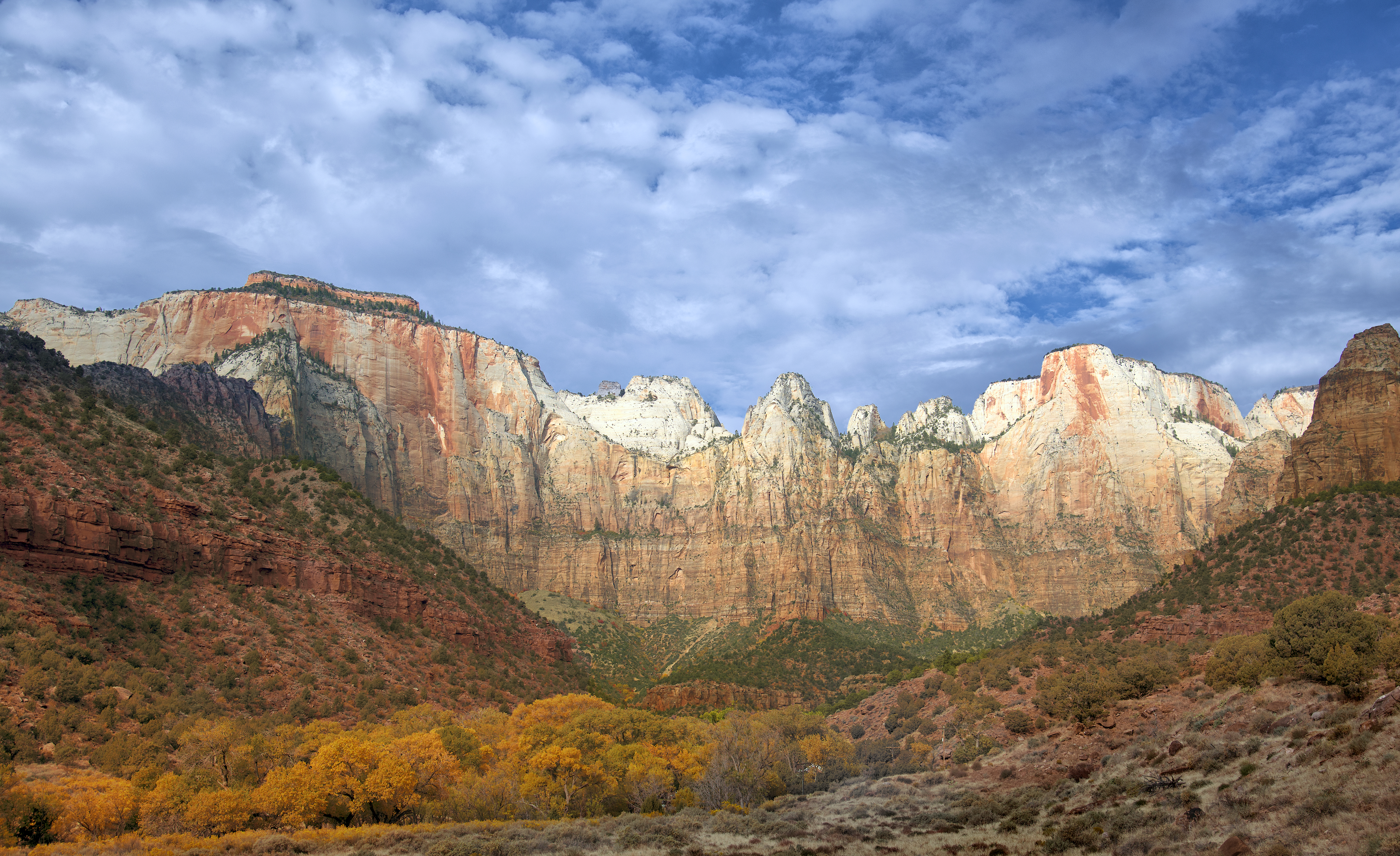
The West Temple (left), The Sundial, The Witch Head, Altar of Sacrifice (right)

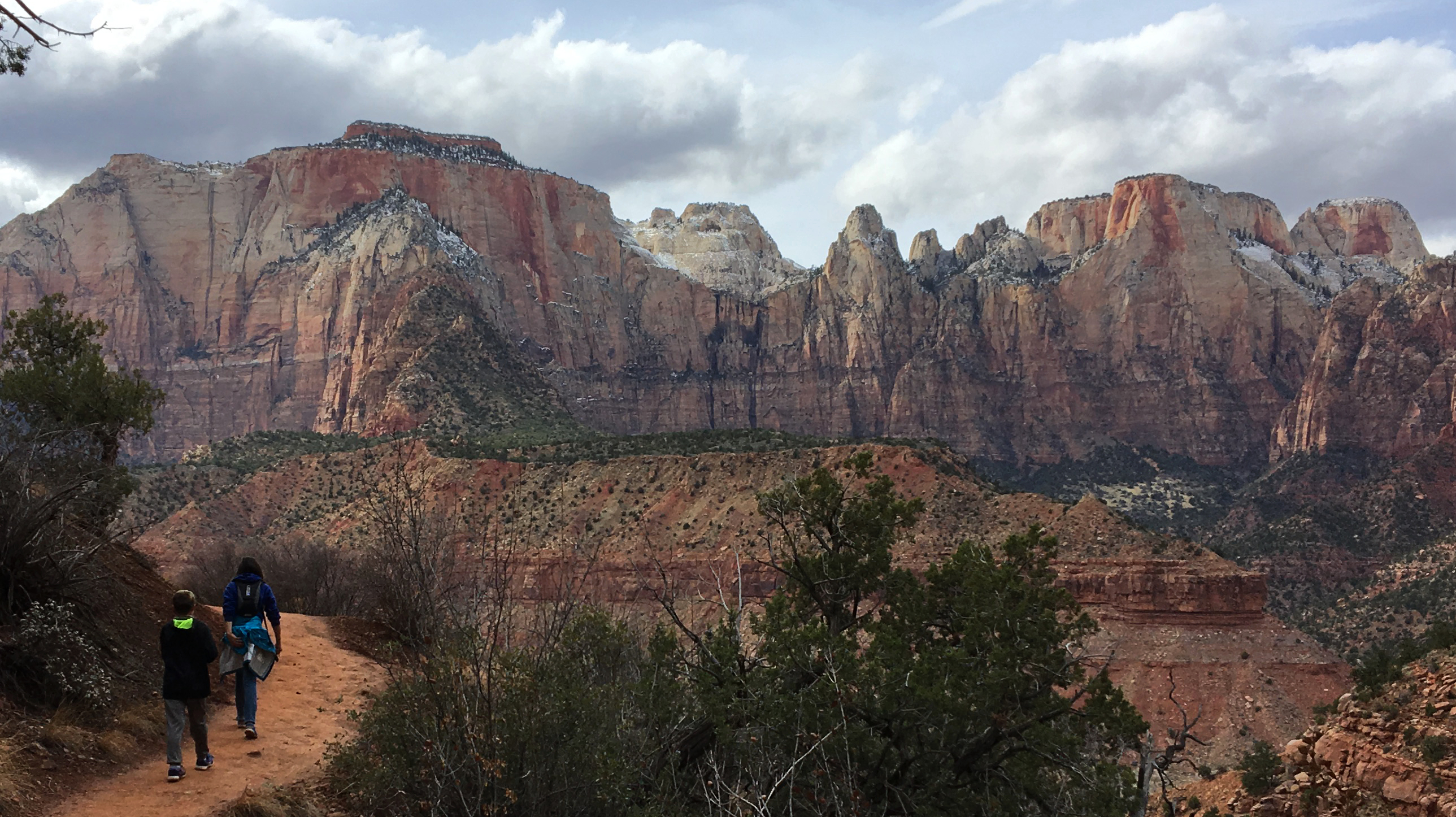
The West Temple (left), Altar of Sacrifice (right)

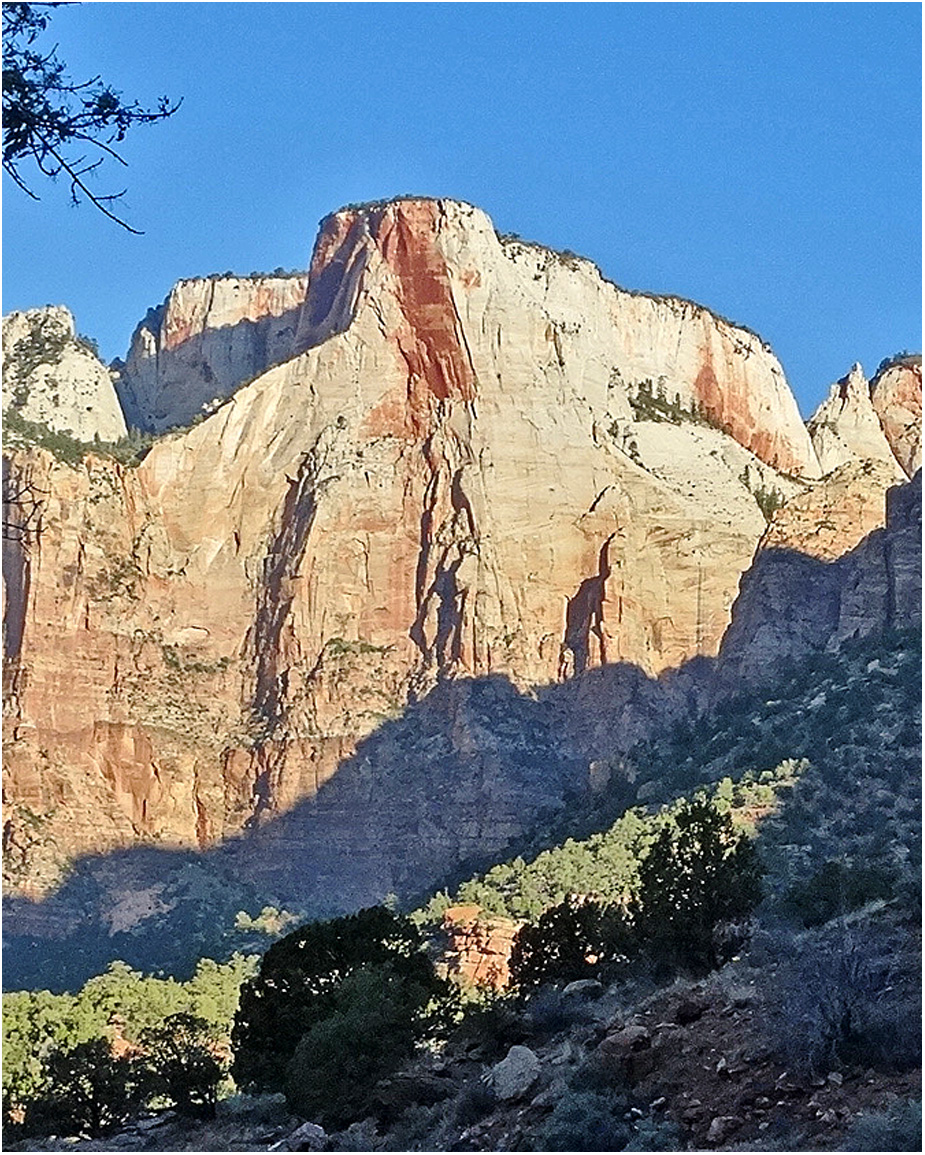

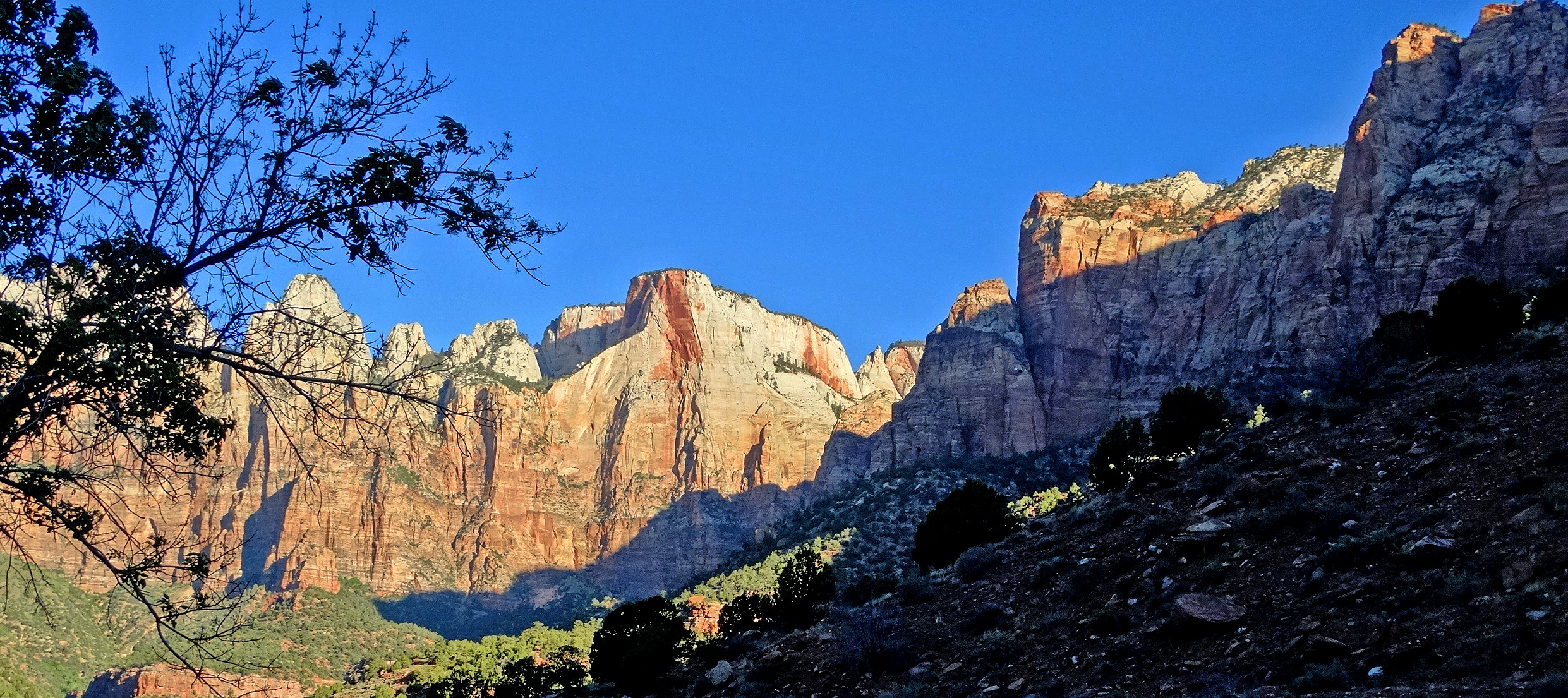

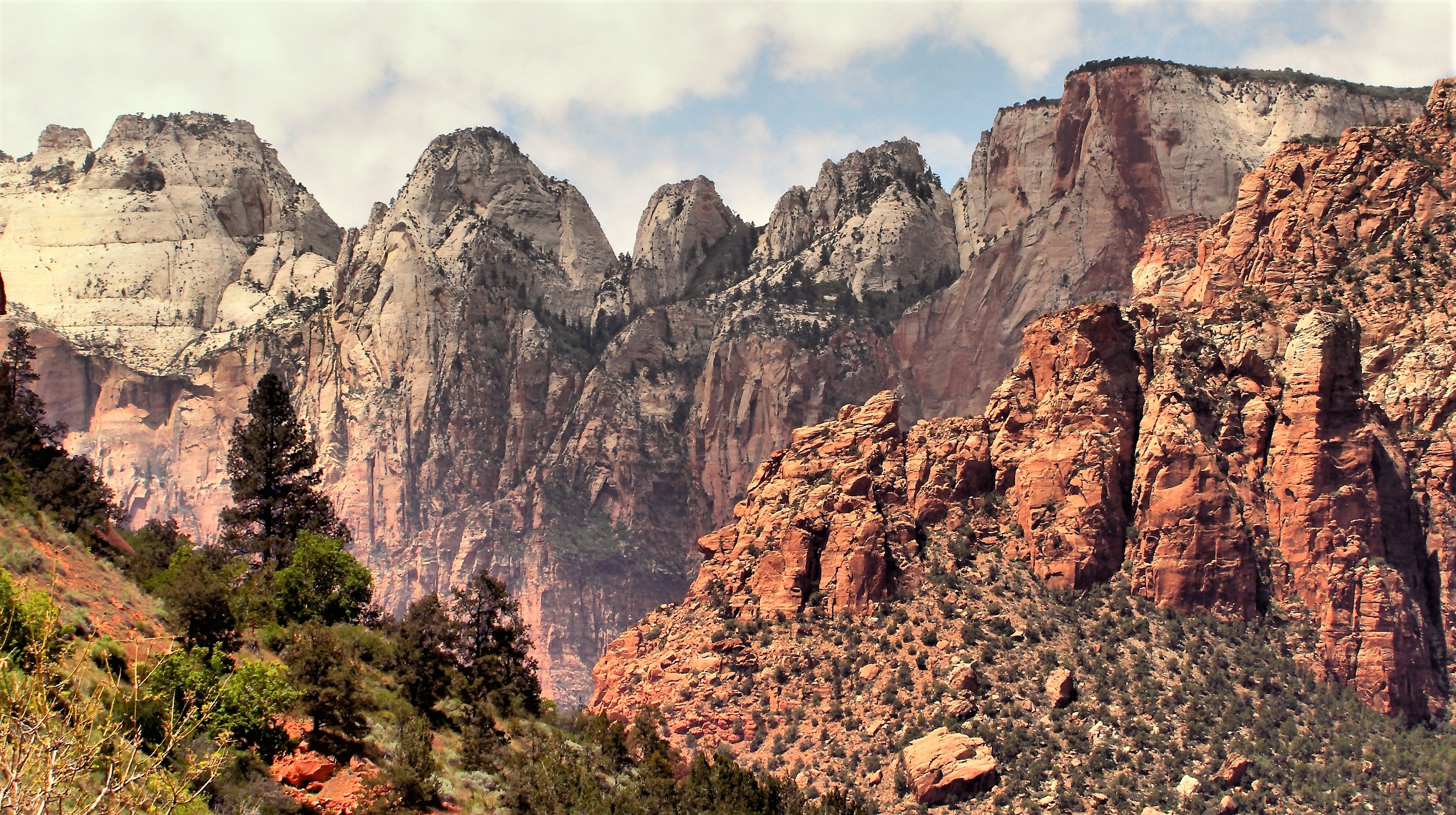
Towers of the Virgin. Left to rightː The Sundial, The Witch Head, Broken Tooth, Rotten Tooth, Altar of Sacrifice (upper right).

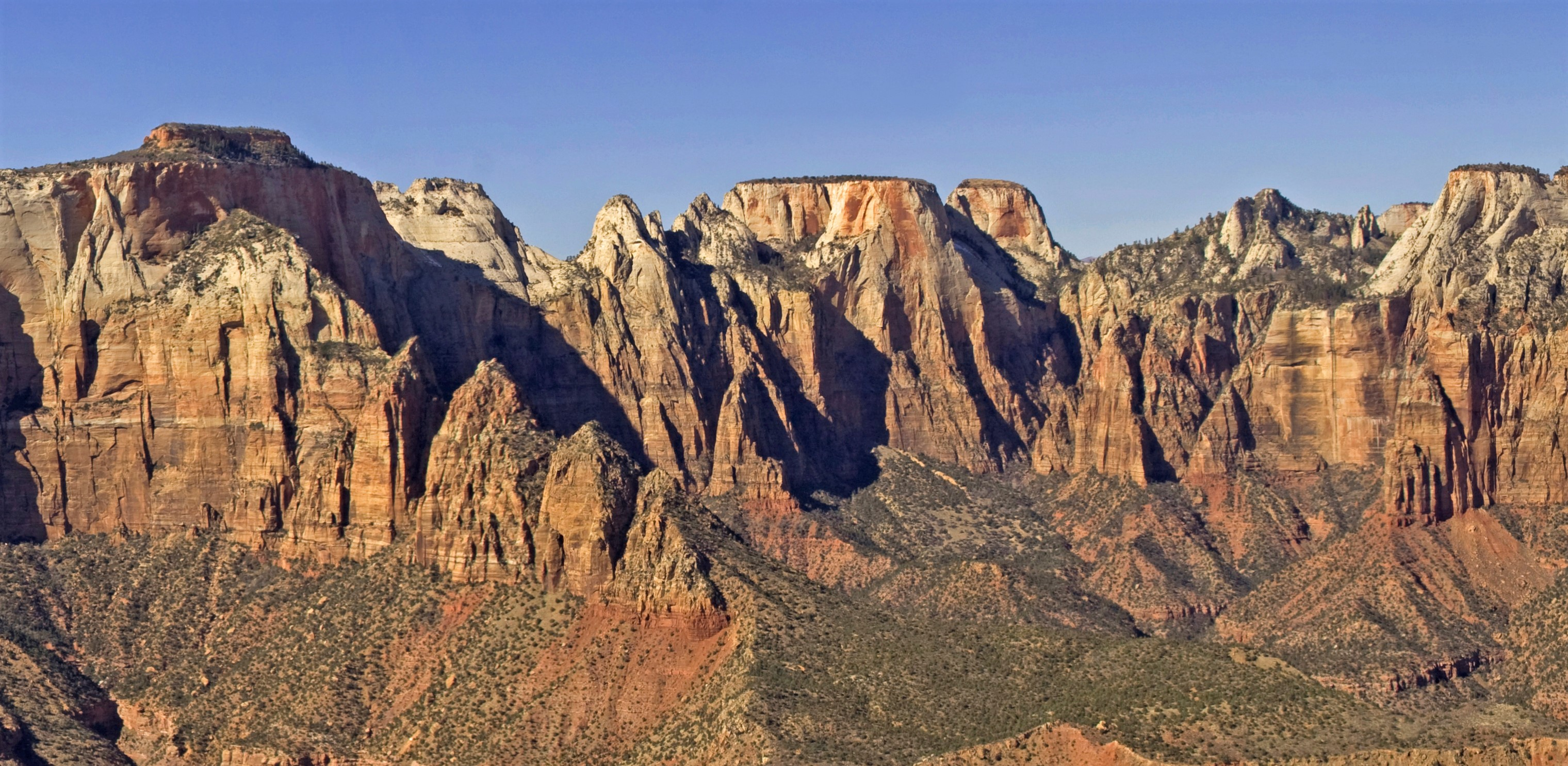
Altar of Sacrifice (centered) seen from summit of The Watchman

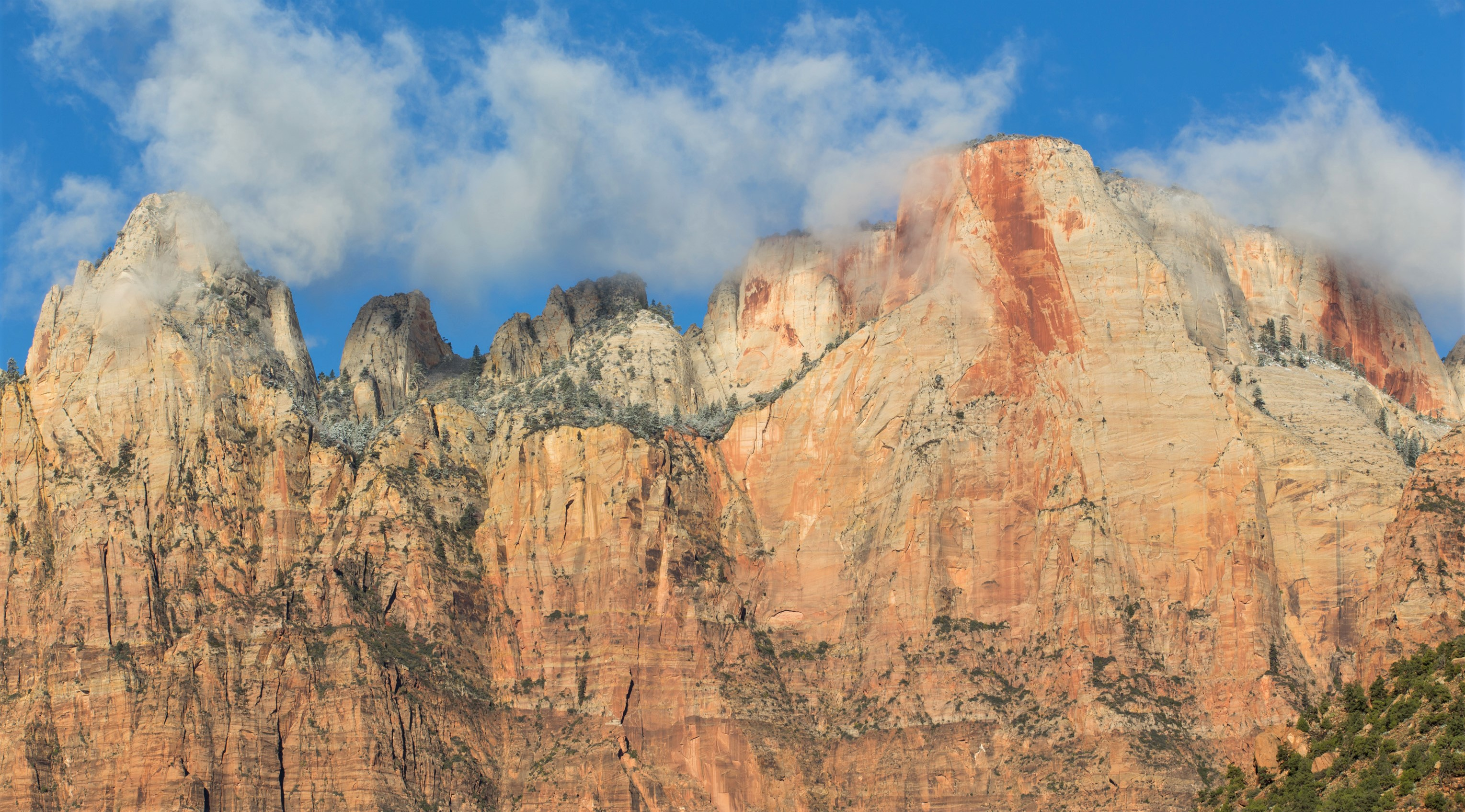
The Witch Head, Broken Tooth, Rotten Tooth, Altar of Sacrifice

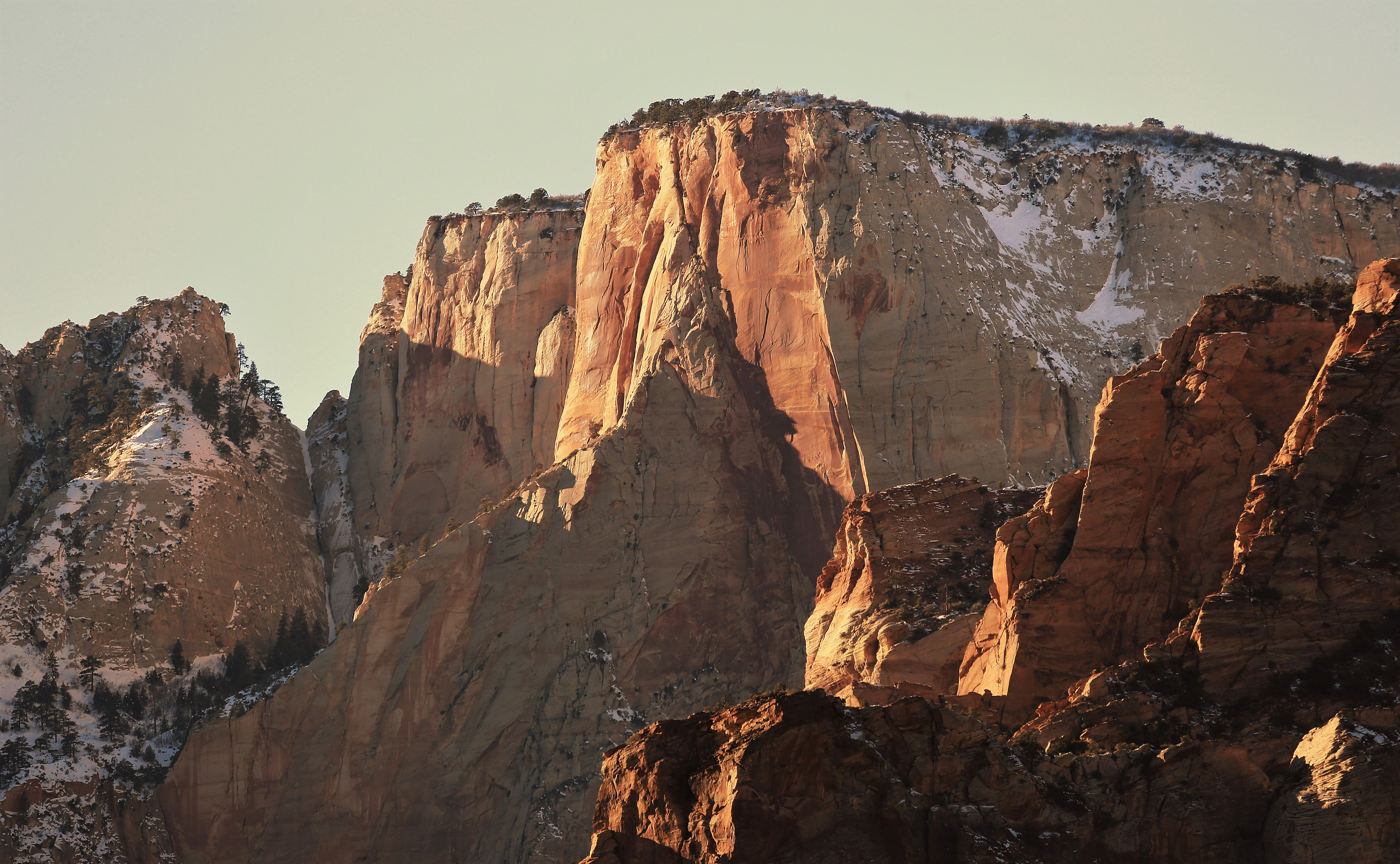

== See also ==
- Geology of the Zion and Kolob canyons area
- Colorado Plateau
