= Late Basketmaker II period =

Ancient culture of the southwest United States

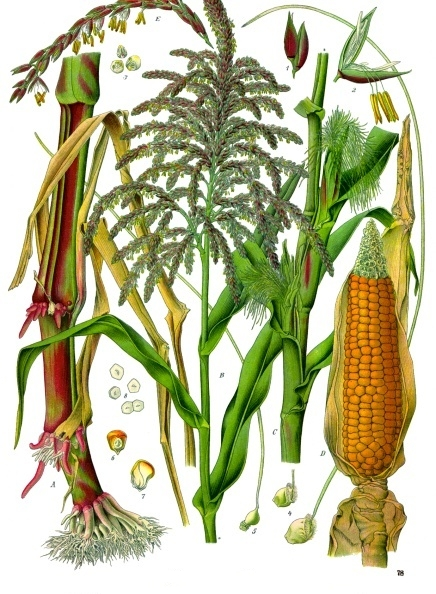
Maize

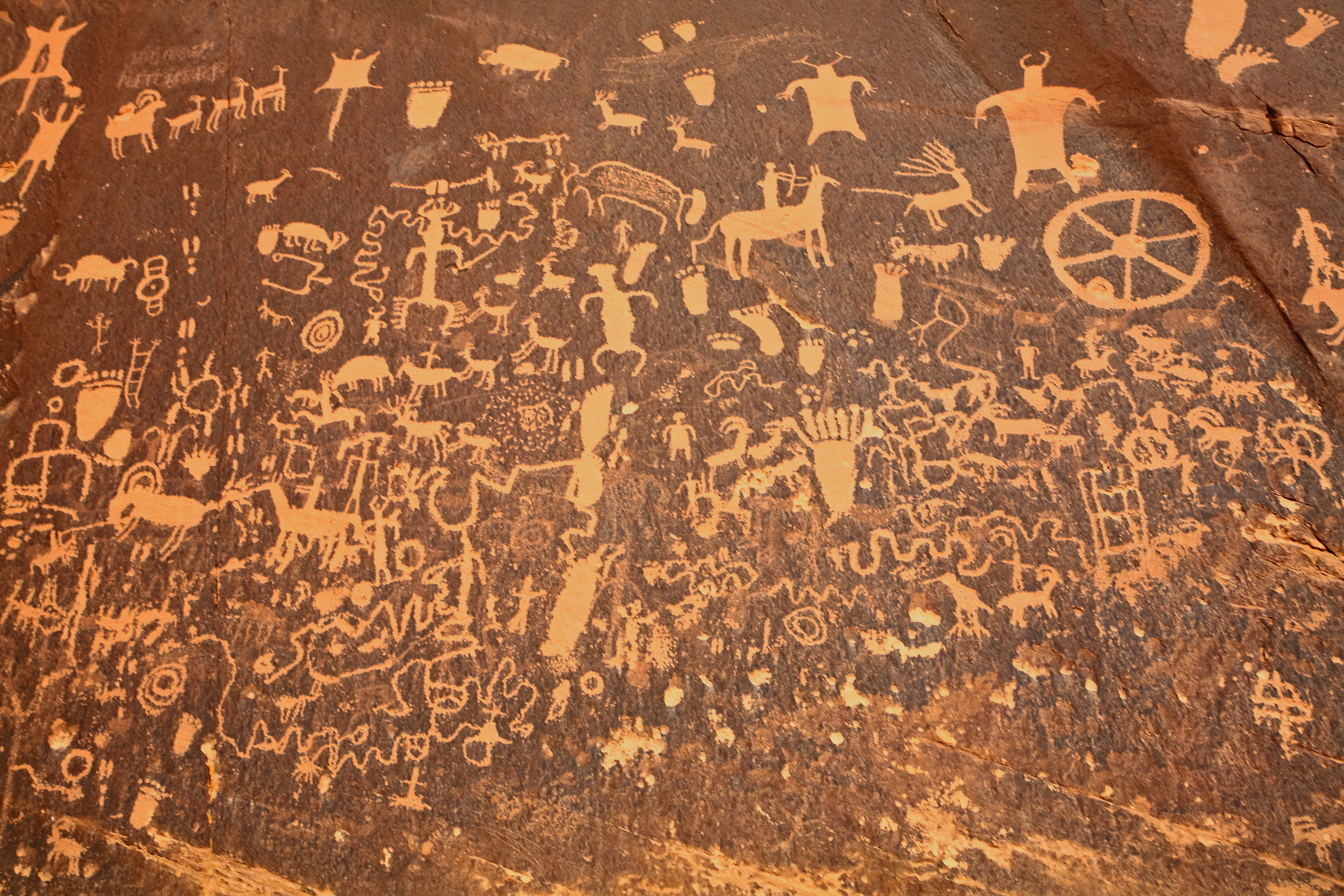
The first carvings at the Newspaper Rock State Historic Monument site were made around 2,000 years ago, left by people from the Archaic, Basketmaker, Fremont, and Pueblo cultures.

Map of ancient Pueblo people in Oasisamerica

The Late Basketmaker II period (AD 50 to 500) was a cultural period of Ancient Pueblo People when people began living in pit-houses, raised maize and squash, and were proficient basket makers and weavers. They also hunted game and gathered wild foods, such as pinyon nuts.

The Early and Late Basketmaker II periods (Pecos Classification) are often described as one "Basketmaker period". It is preceded by the Early Basketmaker II period, and is followed by the Basketmaker III period.

== Communities ==
The primary dwellings of this period were round or circular pit-houses that were built on open land and partially below the ground surface. The entrance to the house faced east or south. Logs and rocks were often used for the dwellings foundation. The building materials for the walls could include stacked logs, jacal or poles and brush. In the center of the dwelling was a fire pit.

Some early people built their dwellings within the natural protection of rock shelters, especially during the beginning of this period.

== Agriculture ==
The Basketmaker II people raised maize and squash, the first people of the northern American southwest to do so, which required them to be located near sources of water and good soil. Carbon isotope analysis of bones of Archaic people compared to Basketmakers indicates that the Basketmakers' diet was rich in maize.

Manos and metates were used to grind maize and other foods. Food was stored below ground in storage cists, often lined with slabs of stone.

== Material goods ==
Excavated items from this period include:

- good quality, tightly woven baskets
- woven yucca bags, sandals and blankets
- robes and blankets made of feather and fur
- stone projectile points, scrapers and knives
- atlatl and throwing spears (the main tools for hunting)
- bone stitching awls, whistles, and gaming pieces
- cord made from yucca and cedar bark
- oval-shaped cradles
- stone pipes

About AD 200, the middle of this period, there was some experimentation with a crude form of brown pottery.

== Cultural groups and periods ==
The cultural groups of this period include:

- Ancestral Puebloans – southern Utah, southern Colorado, northern Arizona and northern and central New Mexico.
- Mogollon – southeastern Arizona, southern New Mexico and northern Mexico.
- Patayan – western Arizona, California and Baja California.

== Notable Late Basketmaker II sites ==
- Chaco Culture National Historical Park – New Mexico
- Darkmold Site – Colorado
- Durango Rock Shelters Archeology Site – Colorado (Basketmaker II type site)
- Glen Canyon – Utah and Arizona
- Hovenweep National Monument – Colorado
- Petrified Forest National Park – Arizona
- Virgin Anasazi – Colorado Plateau of Nevada, Utah and Arizona
