= Virgin Ancestral Pueblo peoples =

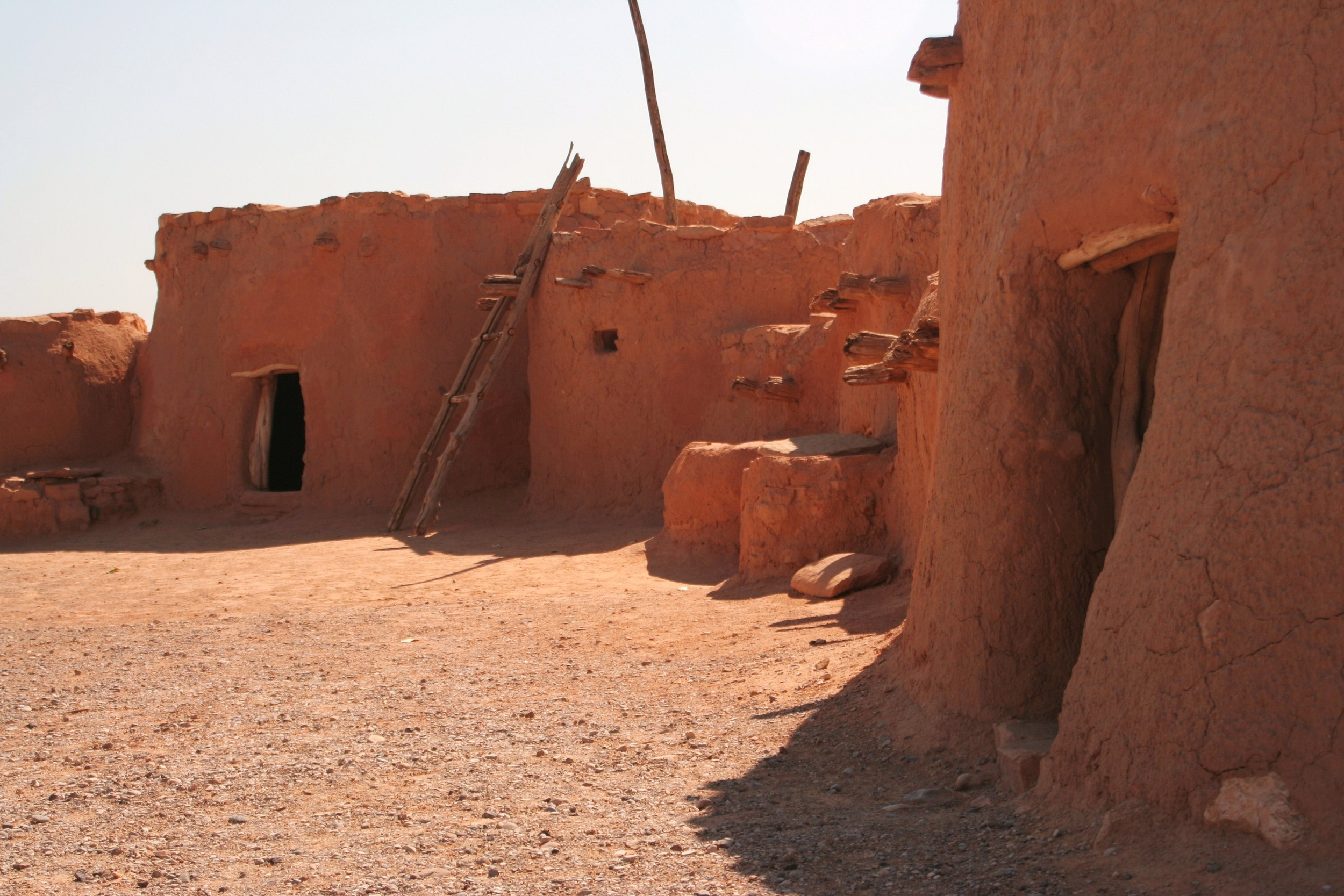
Reconstructed Ancestral Pueblo buildings, Lost City Museum, Overton, Nevada. 2008 photo

The Virgin Ancestral Pueblo peoples were the westernmost Ancestral Pueblo peoples group in the American Southwest. They occupied the area in and around the Virgin River and Muddy Rivers, the western Colorado Plateau, the Moapa Valley and were bordered to the south by the Colorado River. They occupied areas in present-day Nevada, Arizona, and Utah. Their occupation of the area lasted from about 1 CE to around 1200 CE, which according to the Pecos Classification places the occupation from Early Basketmaker II Era to Early Pueblo III periods. Their neighbors were the Fremont culture to the north and the Kayenta Pueblo peoples to the east.

== Regional distribution ==
The Virgin Ancestral Pueblo peoples occupied three regional areas:

=== Plateau ===
The word plateau refers to the Colorado Plateau. This area is diverse in its natural resources and environs. It is characterized by conifer forests at upper elevations, and juniper and pinon pine zones at lower elevations. There are also areas of desert plains where sagebrush is one of the most common plants. This area includes parts of the Grand Canyon and the eastern Great Basin.

=== St. George Basin ===
The St. George Basin is located in and around present-day St. George, Utah. The people who occupied this area usually built their sites on the edges of streams ranging in elevation from 800-1300m.

=== Lowland Virgin ===
The Lowland Virgin area encompasses the areas around the Virgin and Muddy Rivers draining into the Moapa Valley. It is located in the Basin and Range Province. The plant life includes creosote bush, mesquite, cholla, as well as other desert shrubs and plants.

== Lifeways ==
Unlike their eastern counterparts who constructed monumental architecture (as in Chaco Canyon) the Virgin Anasazi lived in small seasonal pueblo groups of only a few rooms.

The Virgin Ancestral Pueblo peoples practiced seasonal subsistence corn agriculture. They often used "dry" farming techniques, i.e. using ground water and rain as the source for irrigation. Later on, though, populations in proximity to waterways used check-dams and canal irrigation. They also utilized local available wild resources such as pine nuts from the Pinyon pine and hunted game including mule deer, jack rabbits, and rabbits.

== See also ==
- Lost City Museum
