= Meridian Tower (Zion National Park) =

Mountain in the American state of Utah

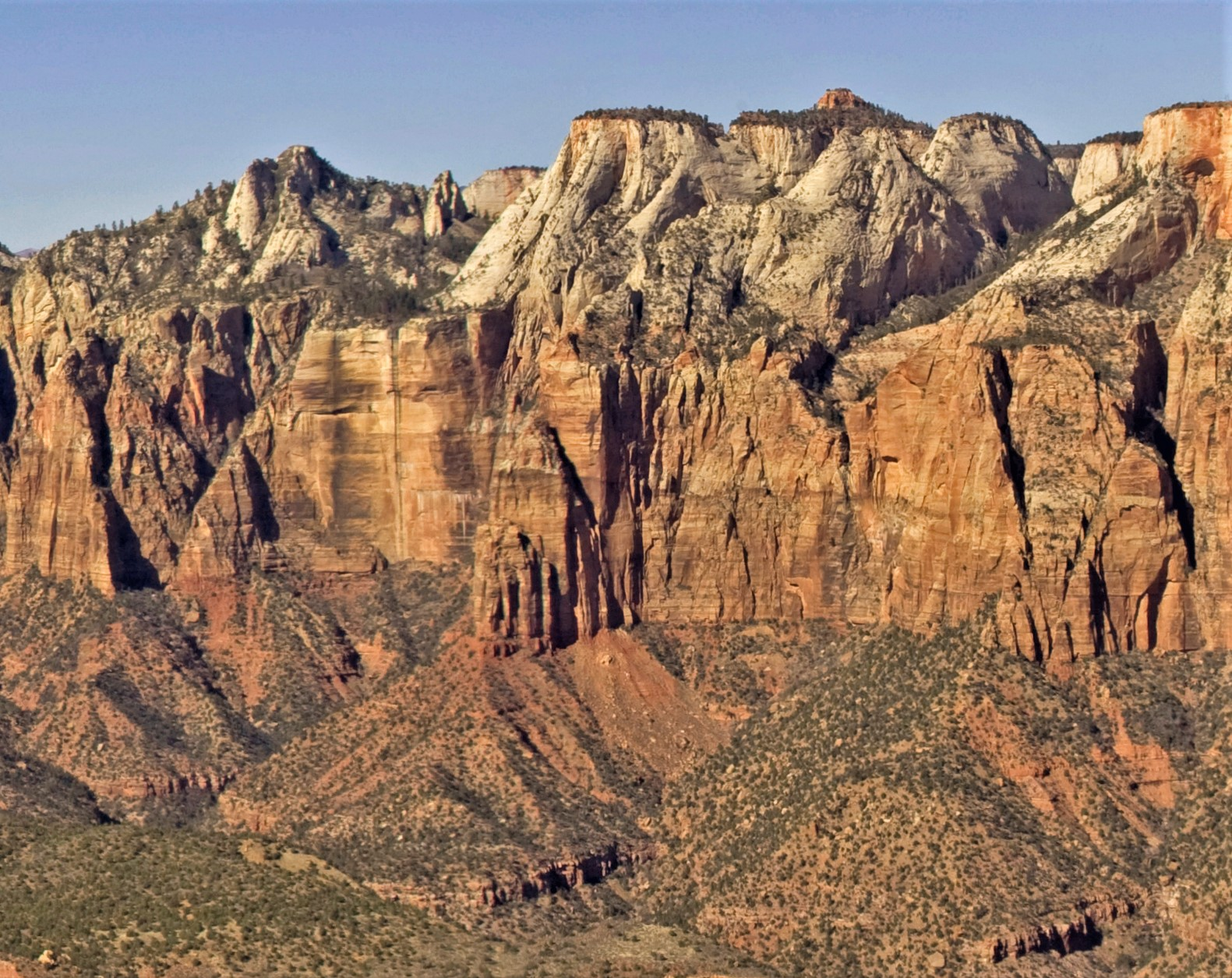
- Meridian Tower (flat top, centered) seen from the SSE from the summit of The Watchman

Highest point
- Elevation: 7,340 ft (2,240 m)
- Prominence: 180 ft (55 m)
- Parent peak: Point 7455 (7,455 ft)
- Isolation: 0.34 mi (0.55 km)
- Coordinates: 37°13′52″N 113°00′05″W

Geography
- Location within Utah Location within the United States
- Country: United States
- State: Utah
- County: Washington
- Protected area: Zion National Park
- Parent range: Colorado Plateau
- Topo map: USGS Springdale West

Geology
- Rock age: Jurassic
- Rock type: Navajo sandstone

Climbing
- First ascent: 2016, Stih and Mower
- Easiest route: class 5.8 climbing

Meridian Tower is a 7,340-foot (2,240 m) Navajo Sandstone mountain in Zion National Park in Washington County, Utah, United States, that is part of the Towers of the Virgin

== Description ==
Meridian Tower is situated 2 mi (3.2 km) northwest of Zion's park headquarters, towering 3,350 feet (1,020 m) above the floor of Zion Canyon and the Virgin River which drains precipitation runoff from this mountain. Its neighbors include The West Temple, The Sundial, The Witch Head, Altar of Sacrifice, Bee Hive, and The Sentinel. This feature was so named by the park's third superintendent, Preston P. Patraw, because its flat top is crossed by the 113th meridian. Meridian Tower's name was officially adopted in 1934 by the U.S. Board on Geographic Names. The first ascent of Meridian Tower was not made until March 2016 by Dan Stih and Matt Mower.

== Climate ==
Spring and fall are the most favorable seasons to view Meridian Tower. According to the Köppen climate classification system, it is located in a Cold semi-arid climate zone, which is defined by the coldest month having an average mean temperature below 32 °F (0 °C), and at least 50% of the total annual precipitation being received during the spring and summer. This desert climate receives less than 10 inches (250 millimeters) of annual rainfall, and snowfall is generally light during the winter.

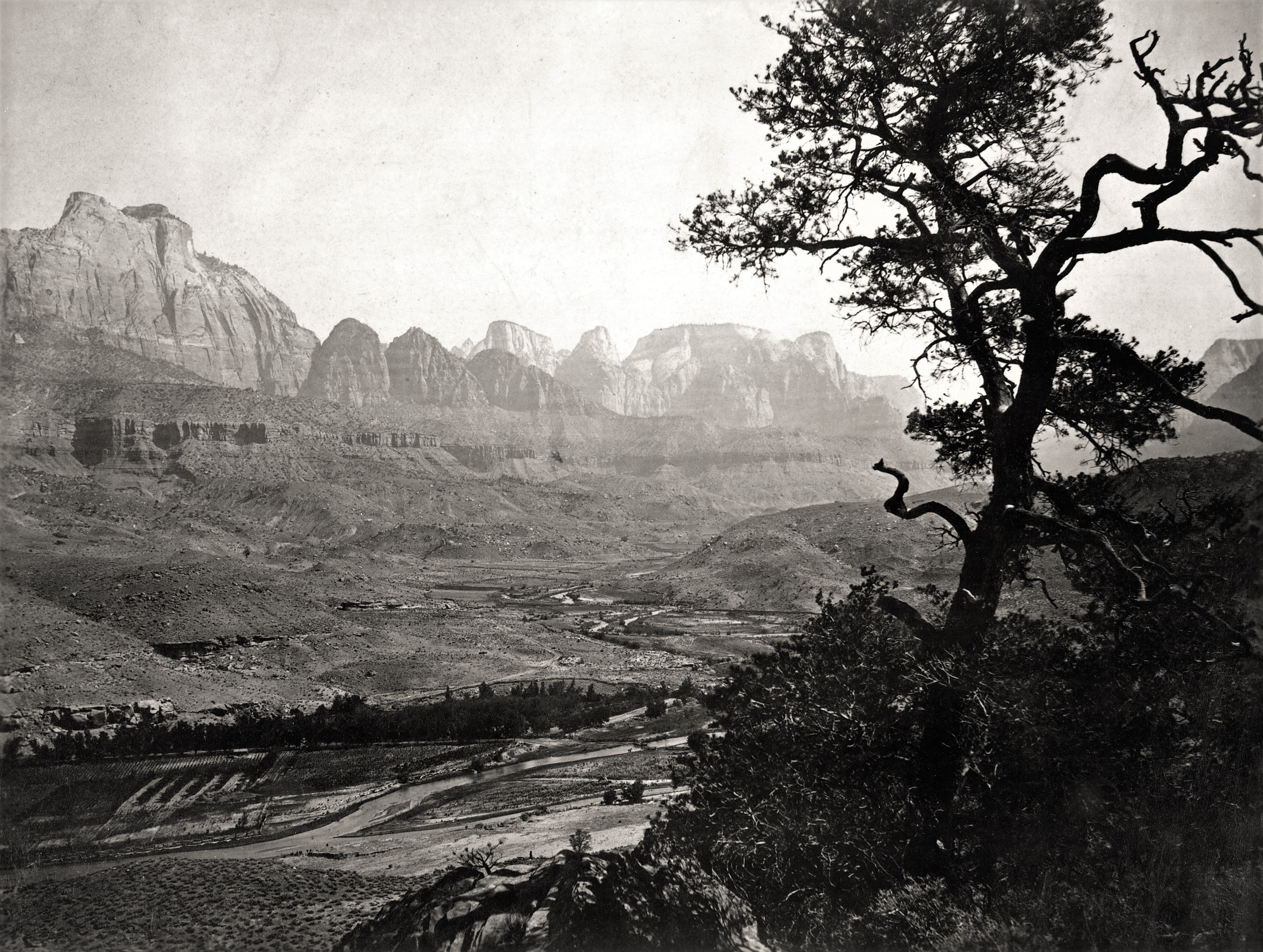
Virgin River Valley, with Meridian Tower behind the Three Marys. by John Karl Hillers, circa 1872.

== See also ==
- List of mountains of Utah
- Geology of the Zion and Kolob canyons area
- Colorado Plateau
