= The Witch Head =

Sandstone mountain in the state of Utah

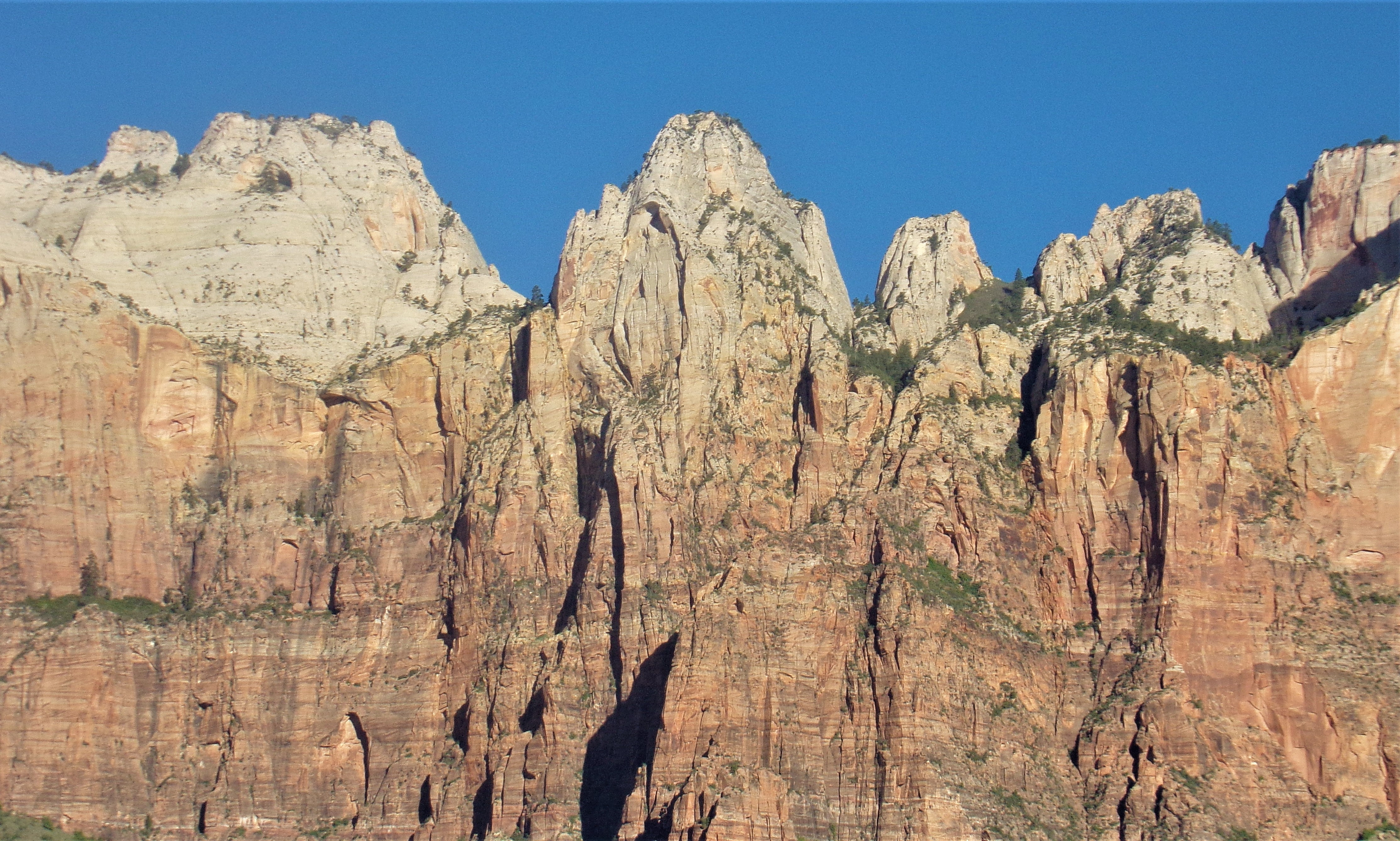
- The Witch Head, east aspect

Highest point
- Elevation: 7,340 ft (2,240 m)
- Prominence: 360 ft (110 m)
- Parent peak: Altar of Sacrifice (7,505 ft)
- Isolation: 0.41 mi (0.66 km)
- Coordinates: 37°13′11″N 113°01′08″W

Geography
- Location within Utah Location within the United States
- Country: United States
- State: Utah
- County: Washington
- Protected area: Zion National Park
- Parent range: Colorado Plateau
- Topo map: USGS Springdale West

Geology
- Rock age: Jurassic
- Rock type: Navajo sandstone

Climbing
- First ascent: 1997
- Easiest route: class 5+ climbing

The Witch Head is a 7,340-foot (2,240 m) white Navajo Sandstone mountain in Zion National Park in Washington County, Utah, United States, that is part of the Towers of the Virgin.

== Description ==
The Witch Head is situated 2.5 miles (4.0 km) west of Zion's park headquarters, towering 3,300 feet (1,000 m) above the floor of Zion Canyon and the Virgin River, which drains precipitation runoff from this mountain. Its neighbors include The West Temple, The Sundial, Altar of Sacrifice, Meridian Tower, Bee Hive, and Three Marys. The first ascent of this feature was made in early March 1997 by Dan Stih and Ron Raimonde via the west face, which they rated a class 5.10 climb.

== Climate ==
Spring and fall are the most favorable seasons to visit The Witch Head. According to the Köppen climate classification system, it is located in a Cold semi-arid climate zone, which is defined by the coldest month having an average mean temperature below 32 °F (0 °C), and at least 50% of the total annual precipitation being received during the spring and summer. This desert climate receives less than 10 inches (250 millimeters) of annual rainfall, and snowfall is generally light during the winter.

== Gallery ==
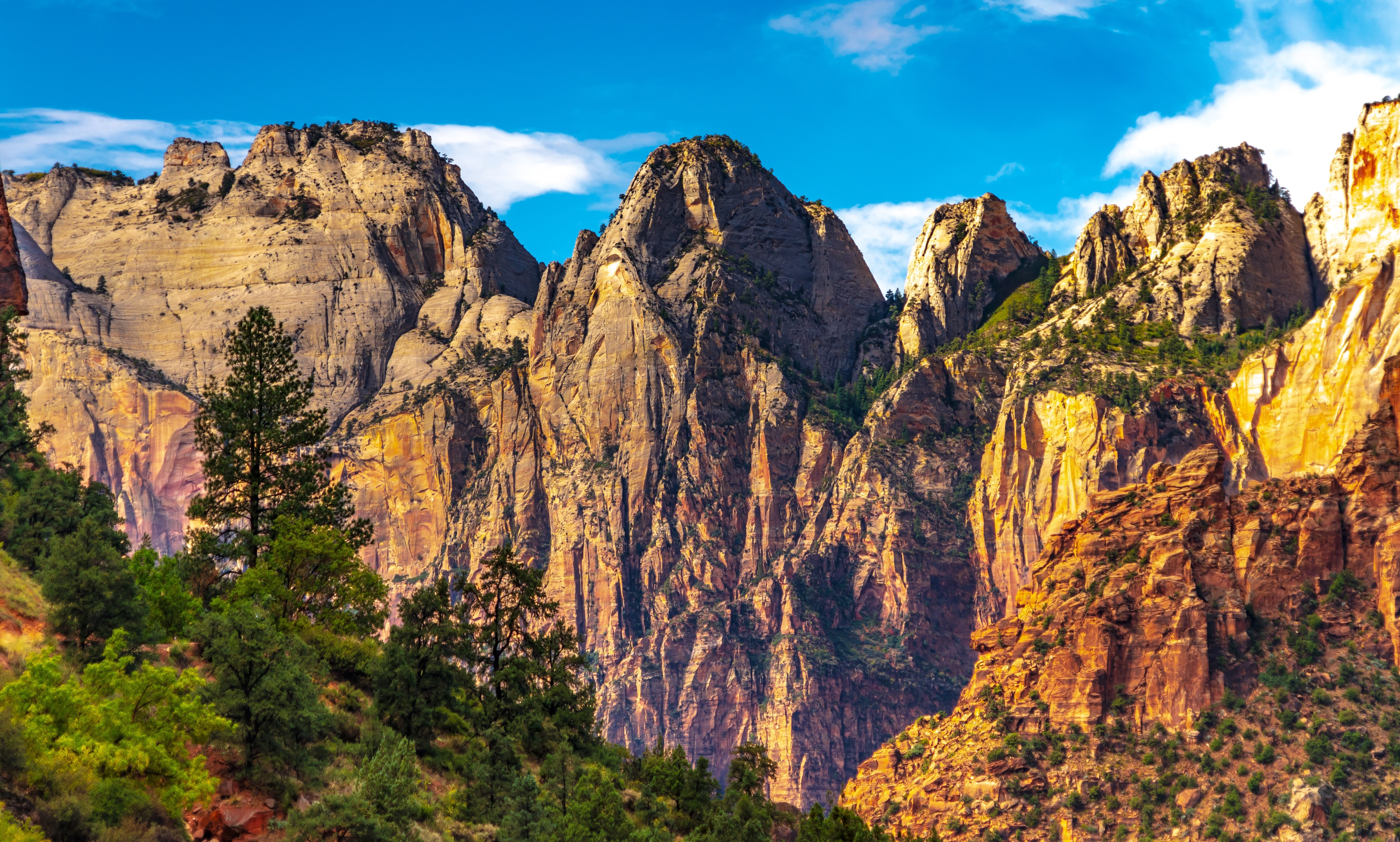
The Witch Head centered

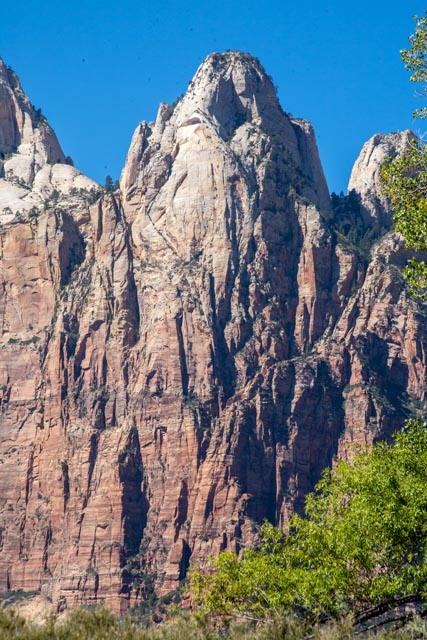

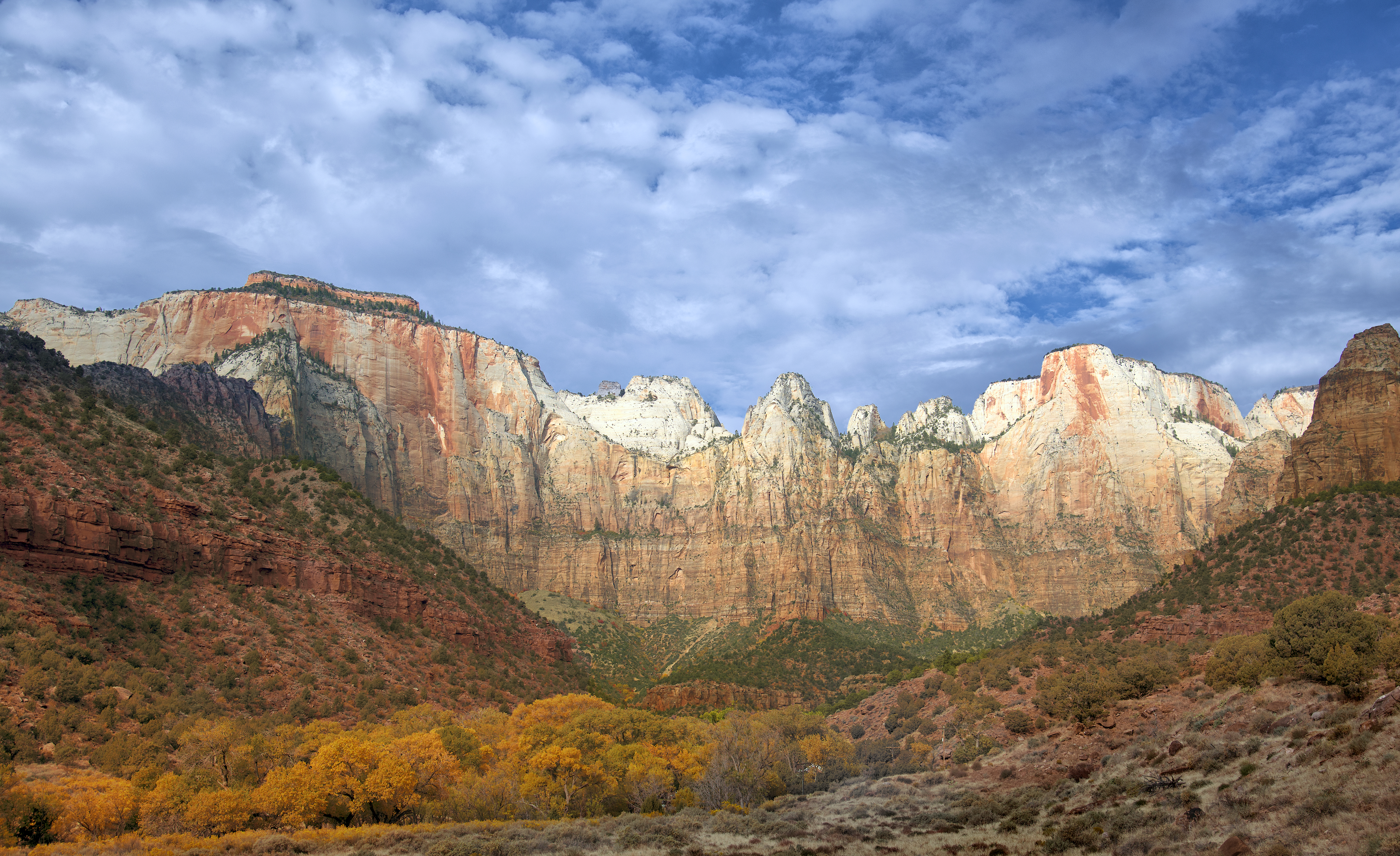
The West Temple (left), The Sundial, The Witch Head, Altar of Sacrifice (right)

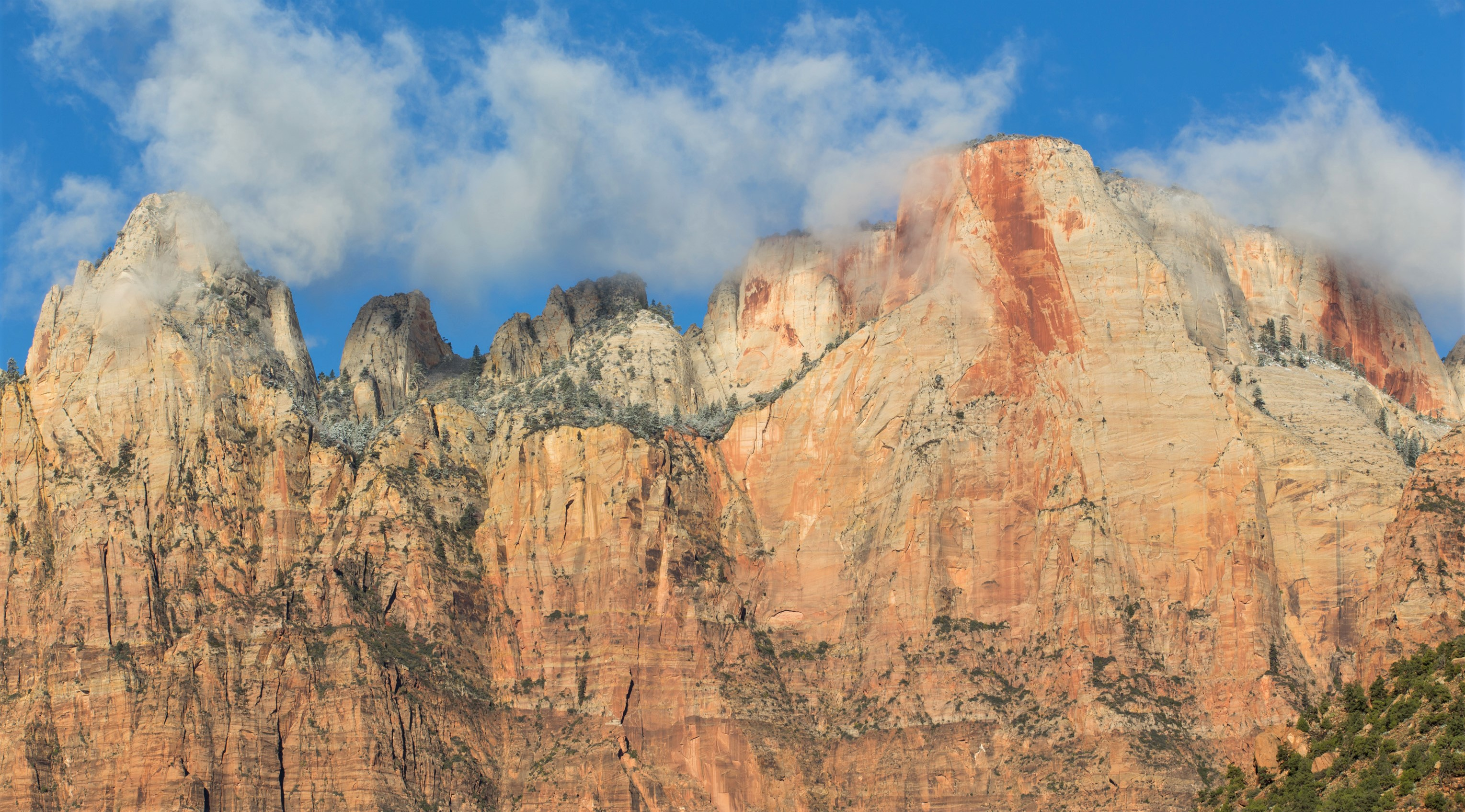
The Witch Head (left), Altar of Sacrifice (right)

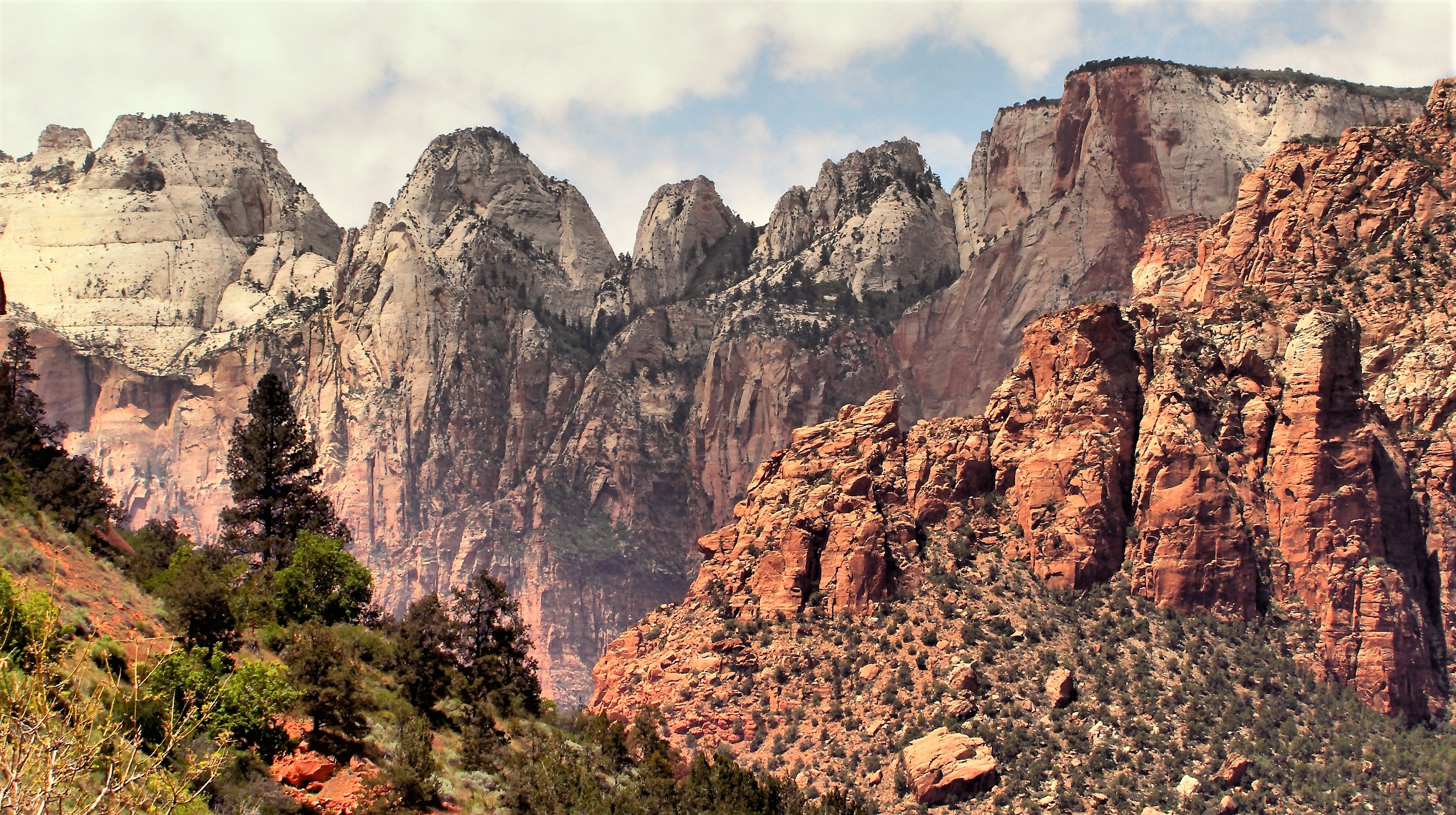
Towers of the Virgin. Left to right:The Sundial, The Witch Head, Broken Tooth, Rotten Tooth, Altar of Sacrifice (upper right).

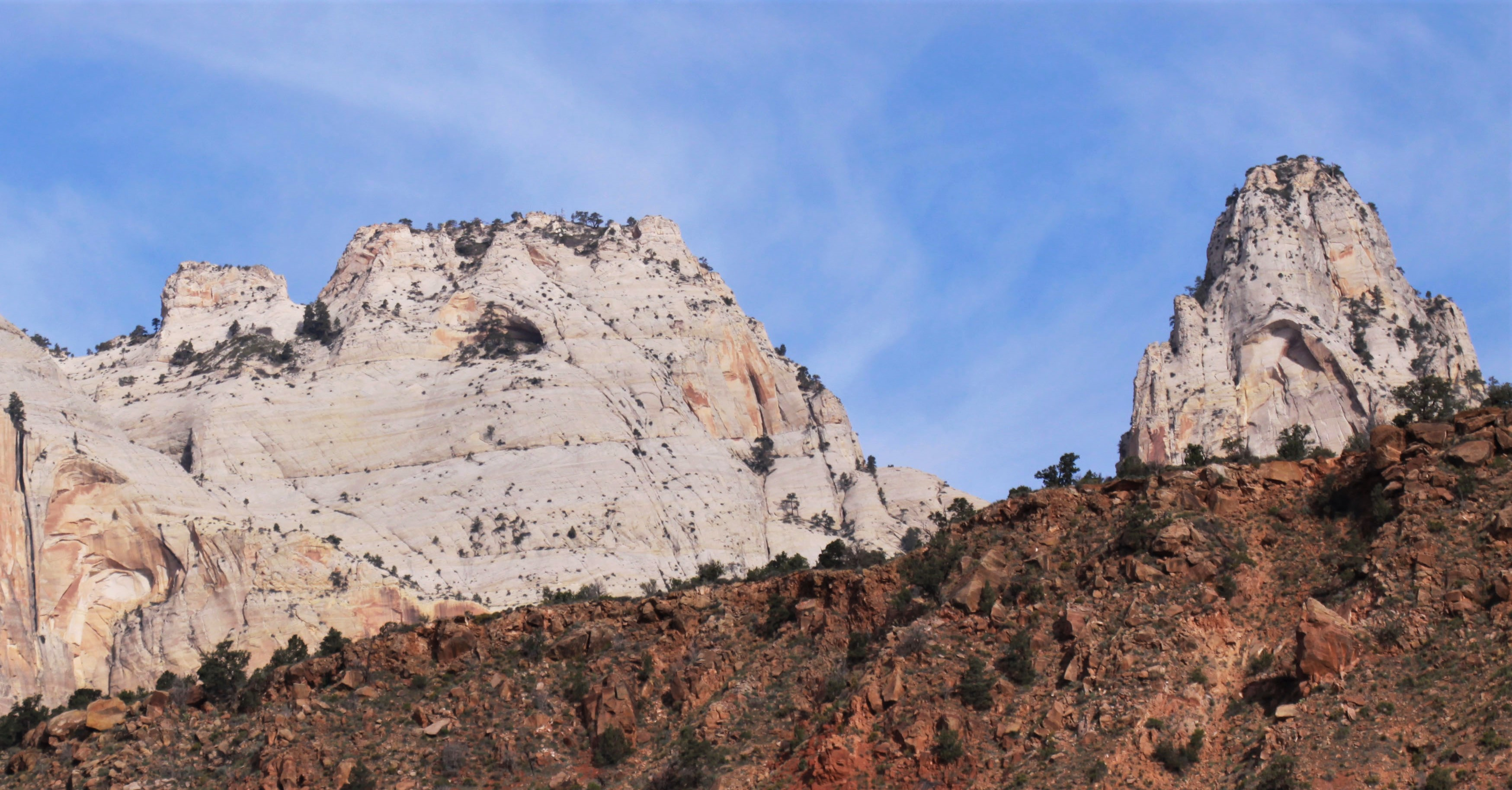
The Sundial (left) and The Witch Head (right)

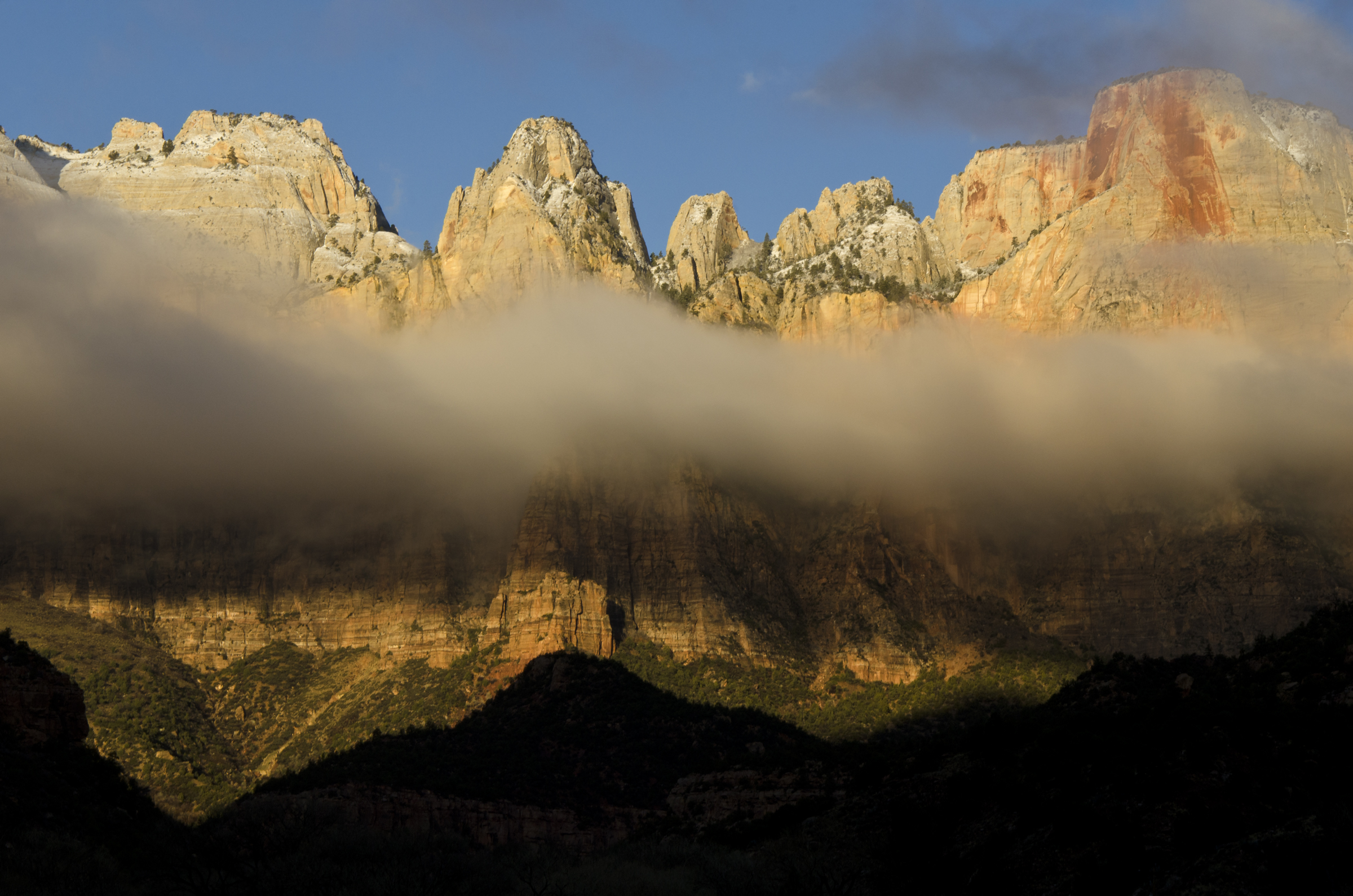
The Sundial (left), The Witch Head, Broken Tooth, Rotten Tooth, Altar of Sacrifice.

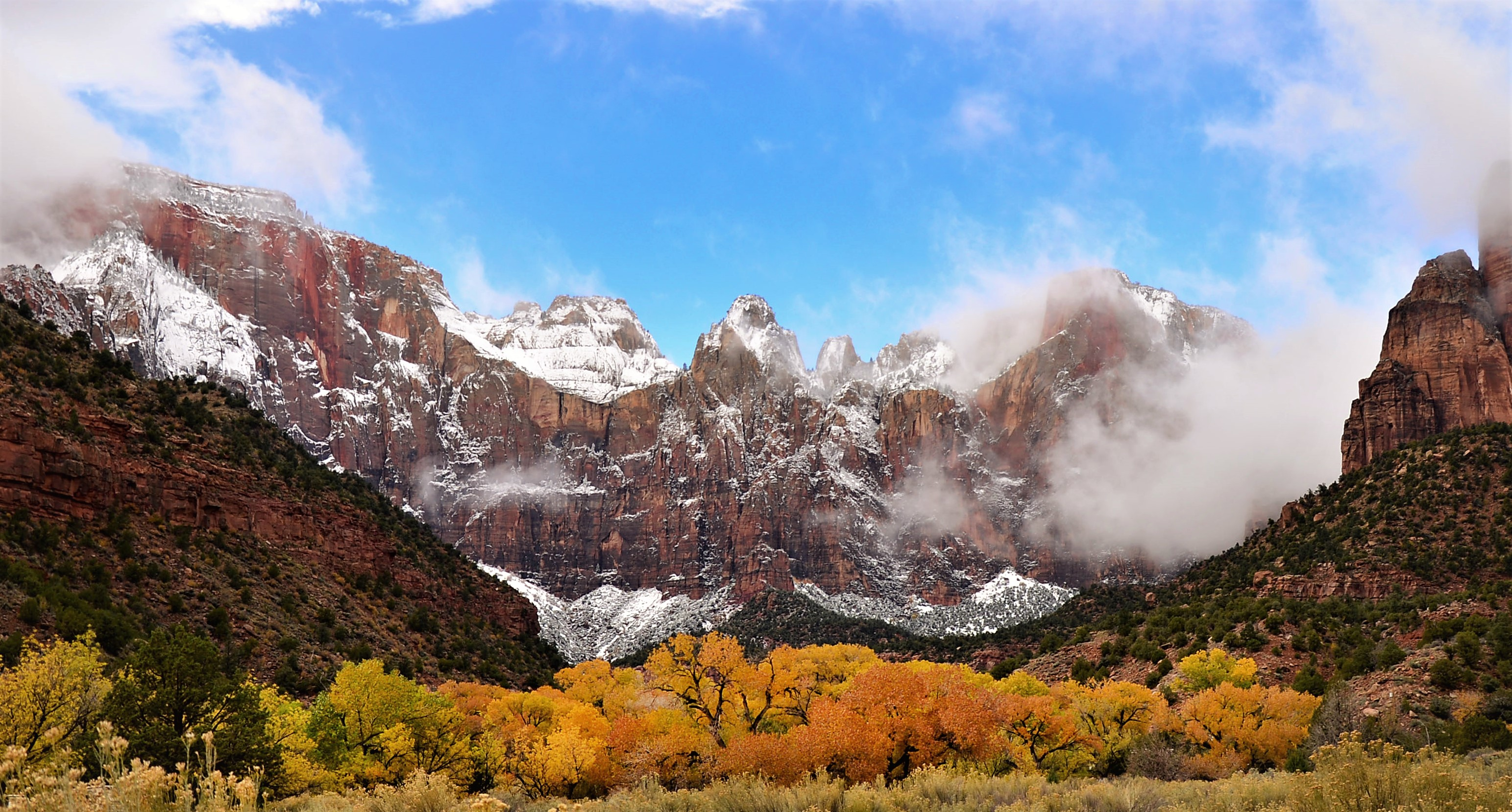
The Witch Head centered

== See also ==
- List of mountains of Utah
- Geology of the Zion and Kolob canyons area
- Colorado Plateau
