= Towers of the Virgin (Zion National Park) =

Rock formation in Zion National Park, United States

Coordinates: 37.23332°N 113.01744°W

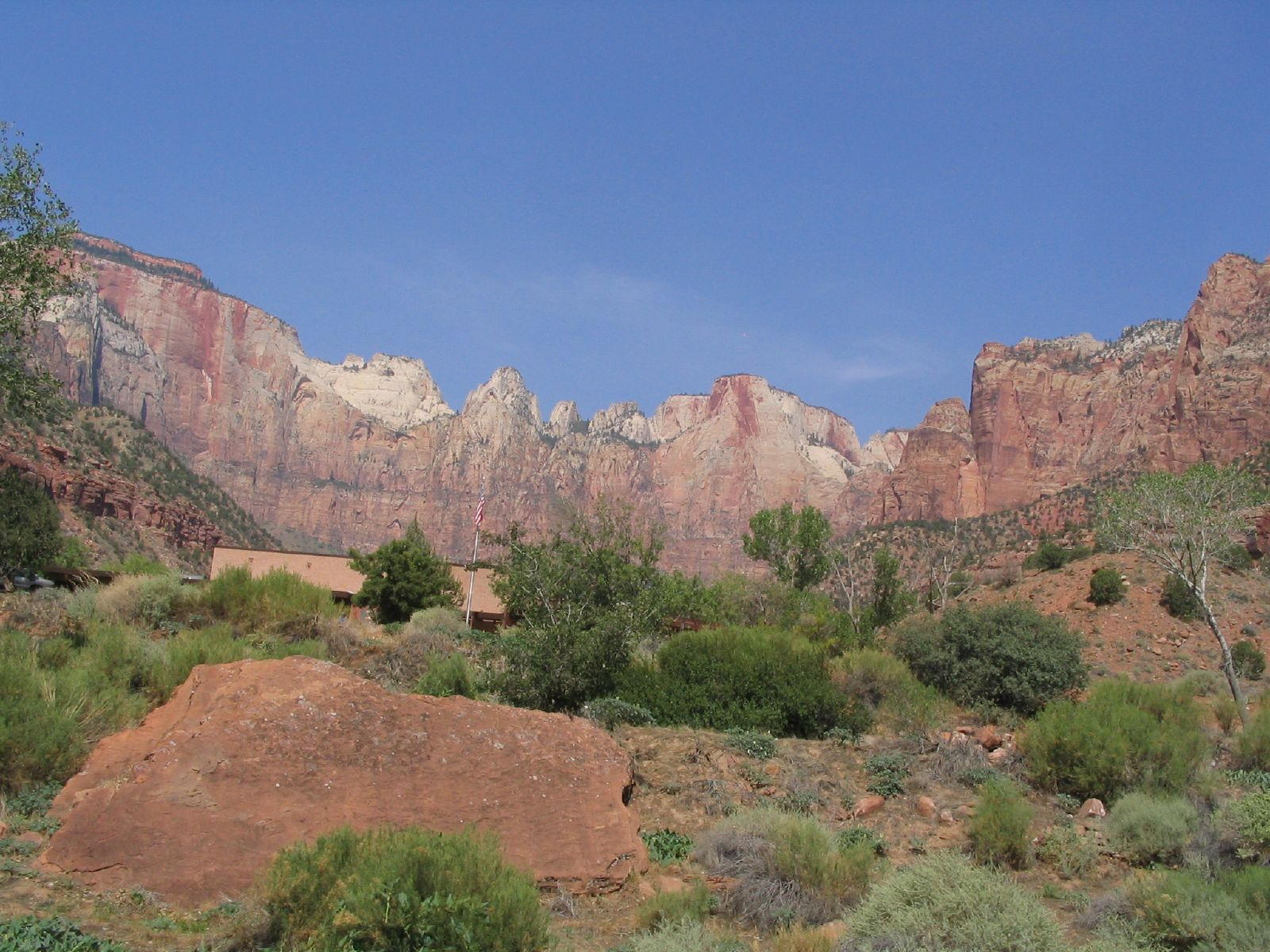
- Towers of the Virgin, with the Zion Human History Museum in left front, August 2007

Highest point
- Elevation: 7,340 ft (2,240 m)

Geography

The Towers of the Virgin is a series of several lofty sandstone monoliths on the west side of Zion Canyon in Zion National Park in Washington County, Utah, United States.

== Description ==
The peaks of the Towers of the Virgin (from south to northeast) include: The Sundial, The Witch Head, Broken Tooth, Rotten Tooth, Altar of Sacrifice, Meridian Tower, Bee Hive, and The Sentinel. The Towers of the Virgin have also been known as Rock Rovers' Land, Temples of the Virgen, and Tu'-Mu-Ur-Ru-Gwait'Si-Gaip Tu-Weap' and were included in the original boundaries of what was known as Zion National Monument.

== Climate ==
Spring and fall are the most favorable seasons to visit the Towers of the Virgin. According to the Köppen climate classification system, it is located in a cold semi-arid climate zone, which is defined by the coldest month having an average mean temperature below 32 °F (0 °C), and at least 50% of the total annual precipitation being received during the spring and summer. This desert climate receives less than 10 inches (250 millimeters) of annual rainfall, and snowfall is generally light during the winter.

== See also ==
- List of Mountains in Utah
- Geology of the Zion and Kolob canyons area
- Colorado Plateau
