= Three Marys (Zion National Park) =

Sandstone pillars in Utah, United States

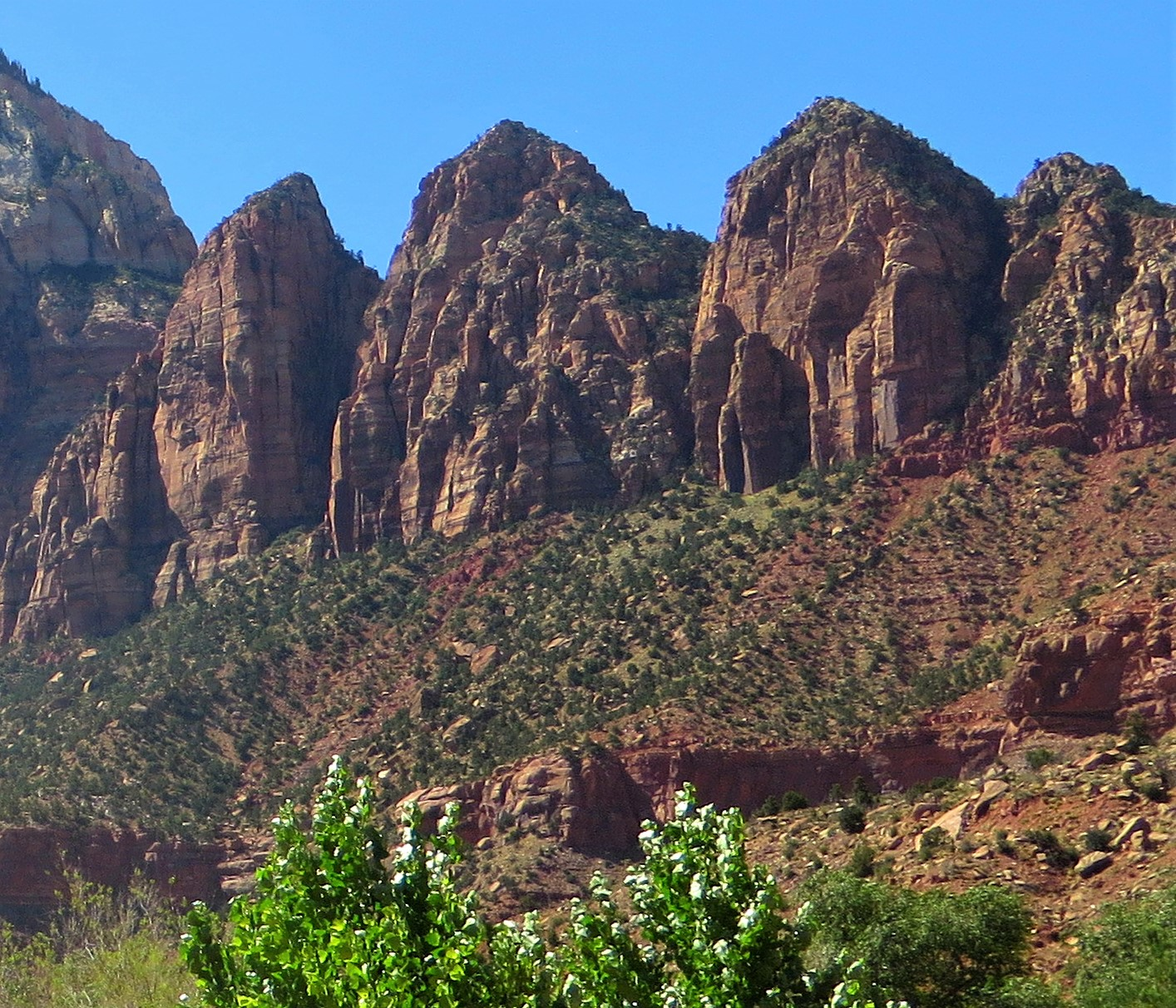
- Southeast aspect, from Springdale

Highest point
- Elevation: 6,420 ft (1,960 m)
- Prominence: 378 ft (115 m)
- Parent peak: The West Temple (7,810 ft)
- Isolation: 0.51 mi (0.82 km)
- Coordinates: 37°12′30″N 113°00′43″W

Geography
- Location within Utah Location within the United States
- Country: United States
- State: Utah
- County: Washington
- Protected area: Zion National Park
- Parent range: Colorado Plateau
- Topo map: USGS Springdale West

Geology
- Rock type: Navajo Sandstone

Climbing
- Easiest route: class 5.x climbing

Three Marys are three sandstone pillars in Zion National Park in Washington County, Utah, United States.

== Description ==
Three Marys is situated immediately northwest of Springdale, Utah, and 1.5 mi (2.4 km) west of the park headquarters. The west peak is highest at 6,420-feet elevation, the middle peak is 6,298-feet, and the east peak is lowest, at 6,020-feet. The nearest higher peak is The West Temple, 0.66 miles (1.06 km) to the west. Other neighbors include The Sundial, Altar of Sacrifice, Meridian Tower, Bee Hive, Bridge Mountain, The Watchman, and Mount Kinesava. Precipitation runoff from this mountain drains into the North Fork Virgin River. This feature's name, presumably for The Three Marys, was officially adopted in 1934 by the U.S. Board on Geographic Names.

== Climate ==
Spring and fall are the most favorable seasons to visit this feature. According to the Köppen climate classification system, it is located in a Cold semi-arid climate zone, which is defined by the coldest month having an average mean temperature below 32 °F (0 °C), and at least 50% of the total annual precipitation being received during the spring and summer. This desert climate receives less than 10 inches (250 millimeters) of annual rainfall, and snowfall is generally light during the winter.

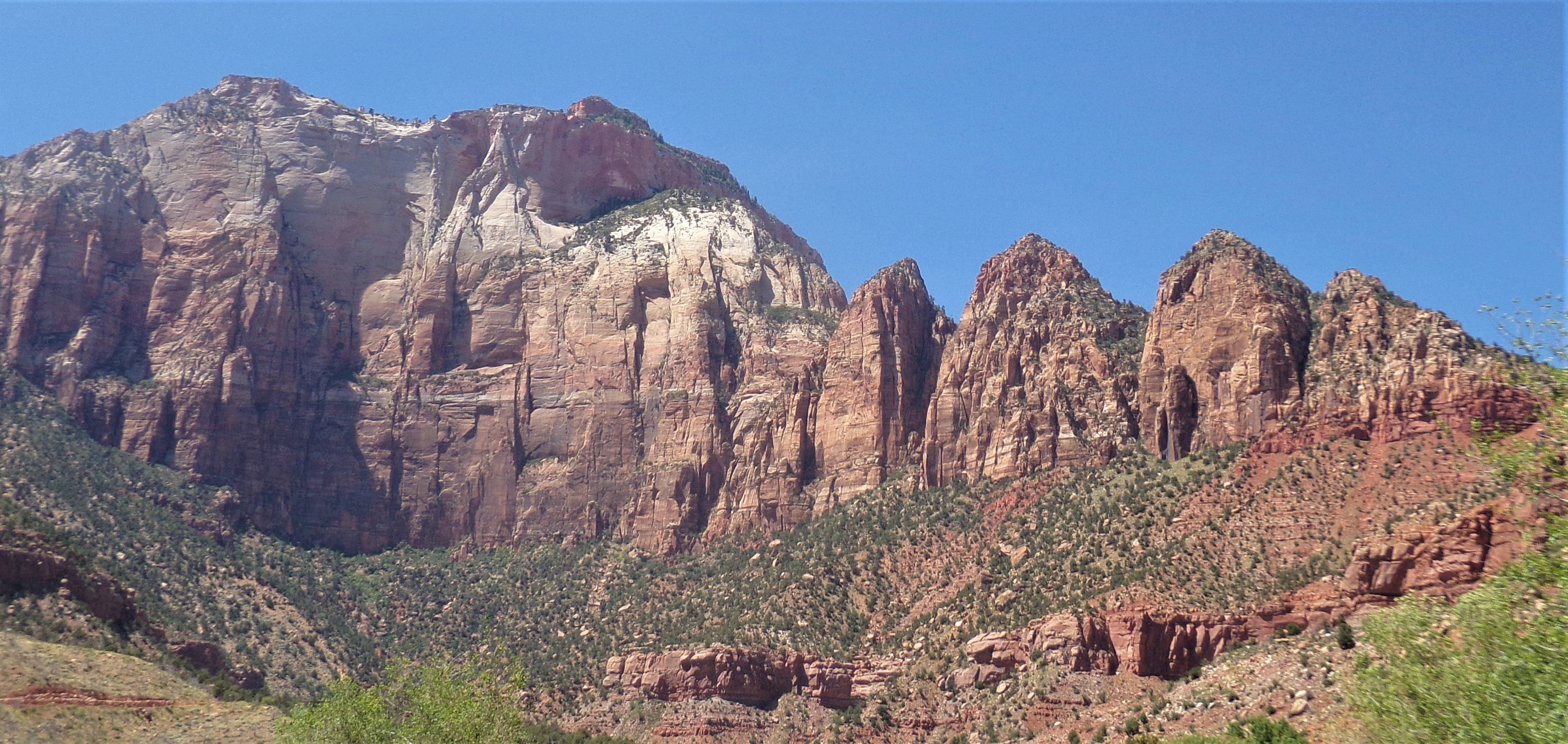
The West Temple (left) and Three Marys

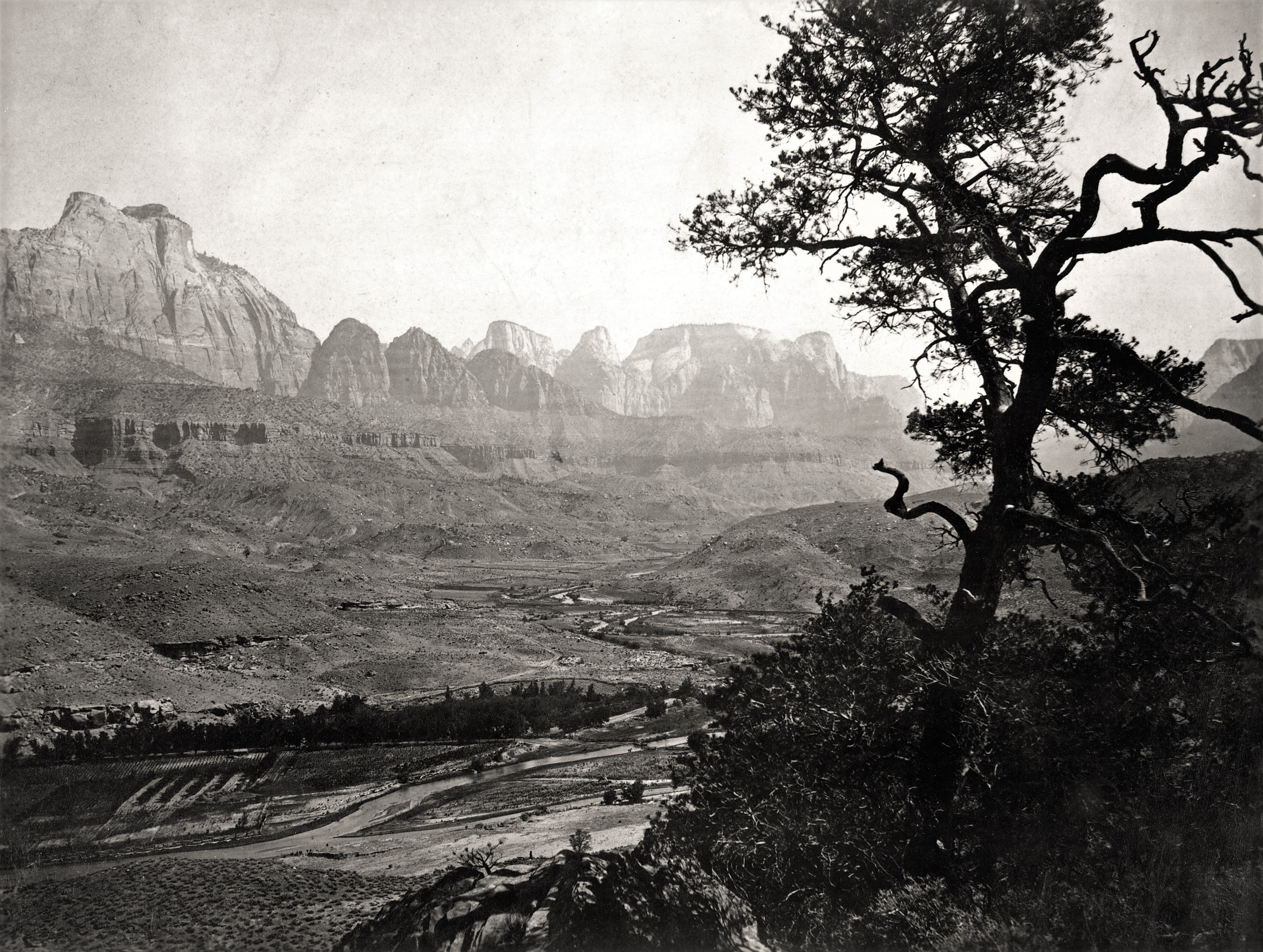
Virgin River Valley, with Three Marys, by John Karl Hillers, 1872.

== See also ==
- List of mountains in Utah
- Geology of the Zion and Kolob canyons area
- Colorado Plateau
