= The Sundial (Zion National Park) =

Sandstone mountain in the state of Utah

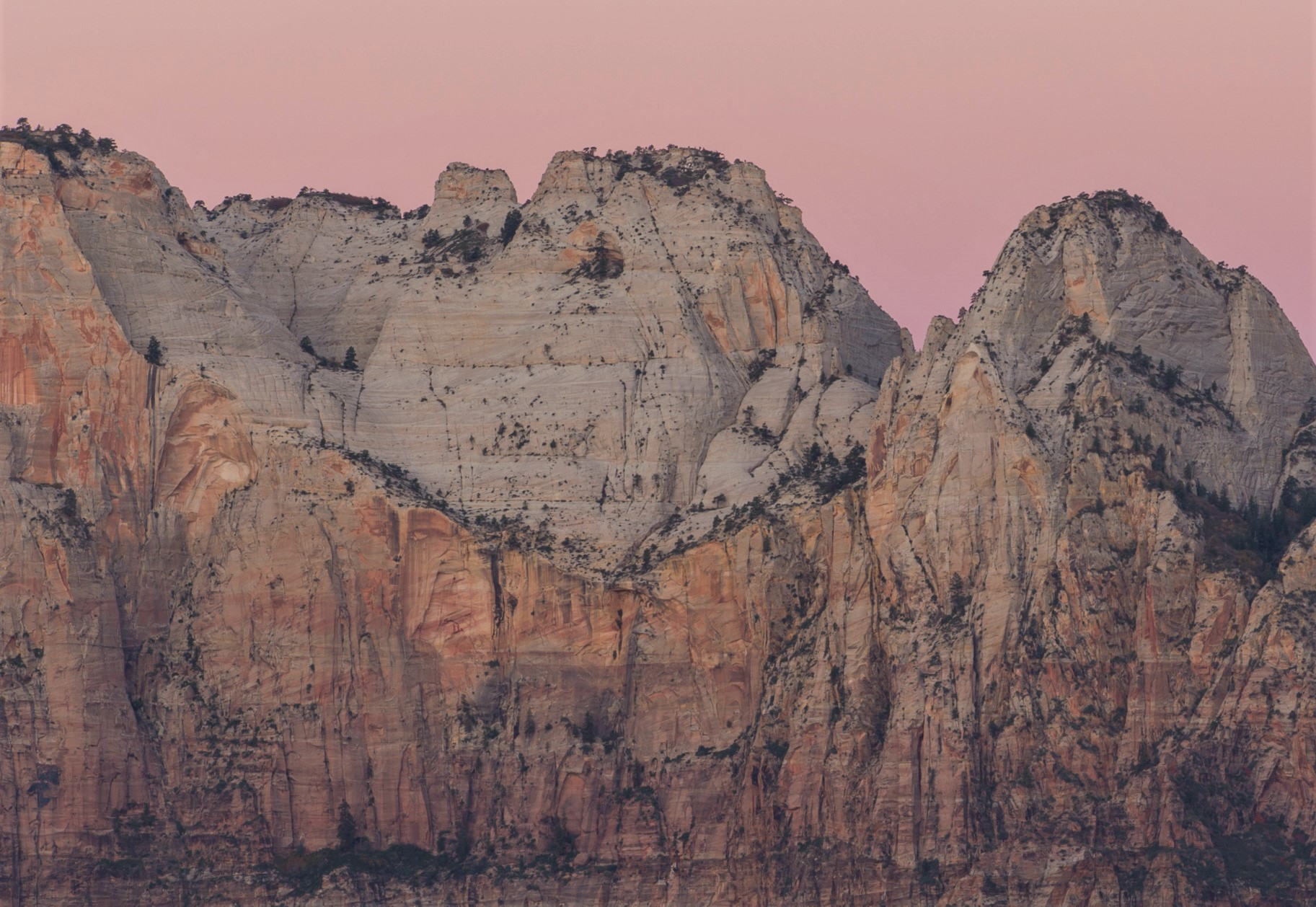
- The Sundial, east aspect at dawn (The Witch Head to right)

Highest point
- Elevation: 7,590 ft (2,310 m)
- Prominence: 530 ft (160 m)
- Parent peak: The West Temple (7,810 ft)
- Isolation: 0.38 mi (0.61 km)
- Coordinates: 37°12′56″N 113°01′27″W

Geography
- Location within Utah Location within the United States
- Country: United States
- State: Utah
- County: Washington
- Protected area: Zion National Park
- Parent range: Colorado Plateau
- Topo map: USGS Springdale West

Geology
- Rock age: Jurassic
- Rock type: Navajo sandstone

Climbing
- Easiest route: class 5+ climbing

The Sundial is a 7,590-foot (2,310-meter) elevation white Navajo Sandstone summit located in Zion National Park, in Washington County of southwest Utah, United States.

== Description ==
The Sundial is situated in the "Towers of the Virgin", 2.5 mi (4.0 km) west of Zion's park headquarters, towering 3,600 feet (1,100 meters) above the floor of Zion Canyon and the Virgin River which drains precipitation runoff from this mountain. Its nearest higher neighbor is The West Temple, one half mile to the southeast, and Altar of Sacrifice is set approximately one mile to the north-northeast. Other neighbors include The Witch Head, Bee Hive, The Sentinel, Mount Spry, Bridge Mountain, and Mount Kinesava. This geographical feature was named by the park's third superintendent, Preston P. Patraw, because it had long been used as a sundial to regulate clocks in the nearby town of Grafton. The Sundial's name was officially adopted in 1934 by the U.S. Board on Geographic Names.

== Climate ==
Spring and fall are the most favorable seasons to visit The Sundial. According to the Köppen climate classification system, it is located in a Cold semi-arid climate zone, which is defined by the coldest month having an average mean temperature below 32 °F (0 °C), and at least 50% of the total annual precipitation being received during the spring and summer. This desert climate receives less than 10 inches (250 millimeters) of annual rainfall, and snowfall is generally light during the winter.

== Gallery ==
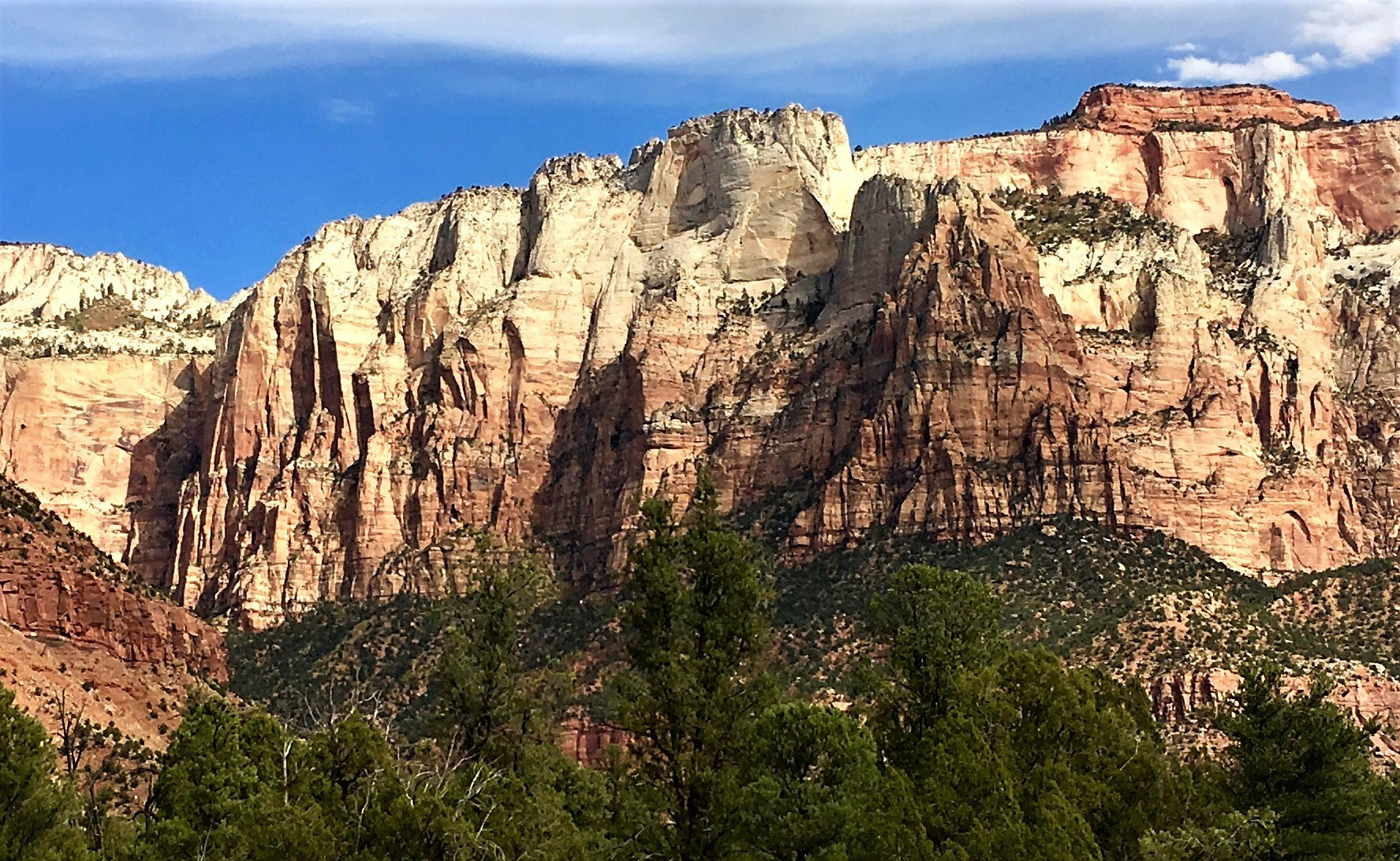
West aspect of Sundial. West Temple to right

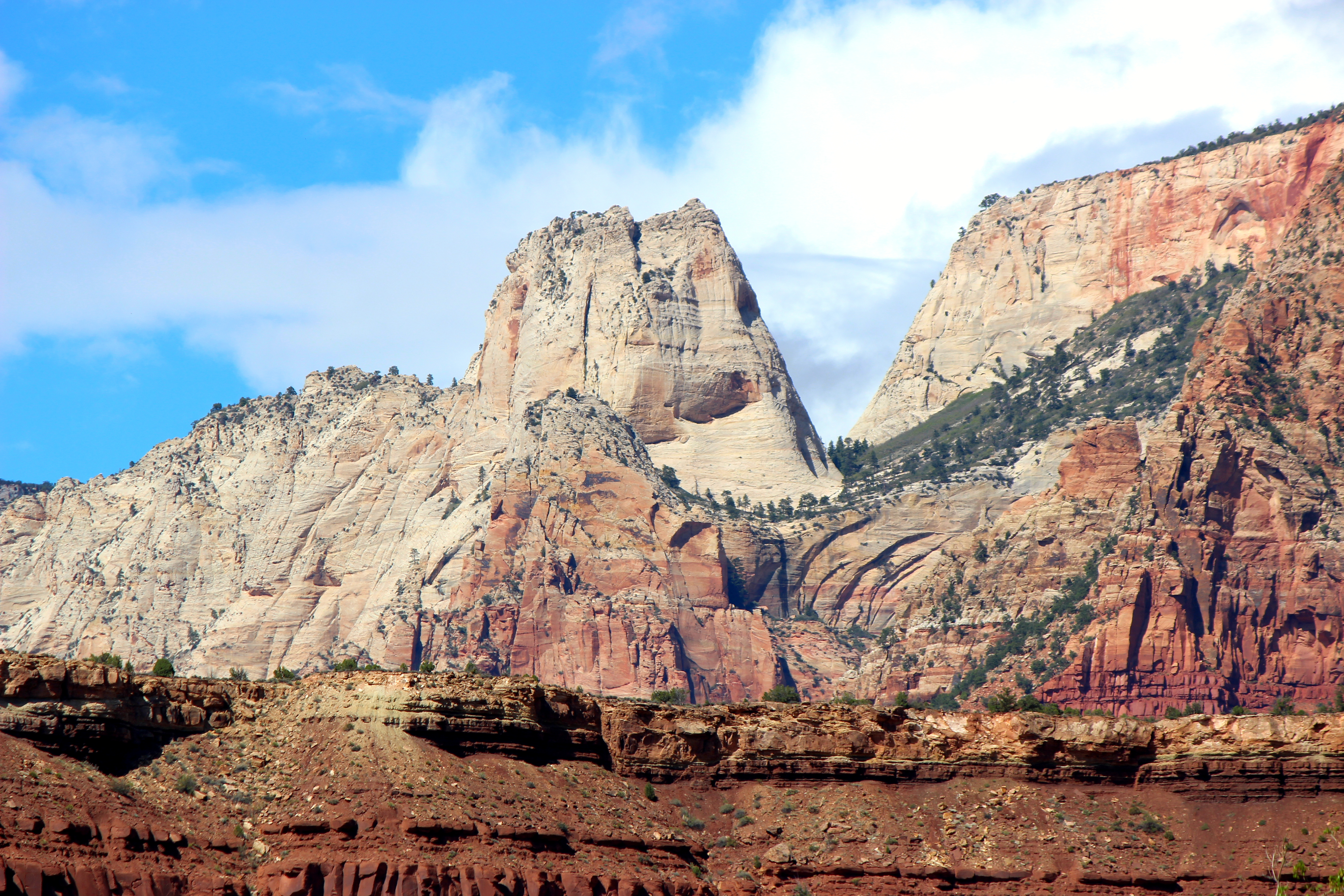
The Sundial centered, from the southwest

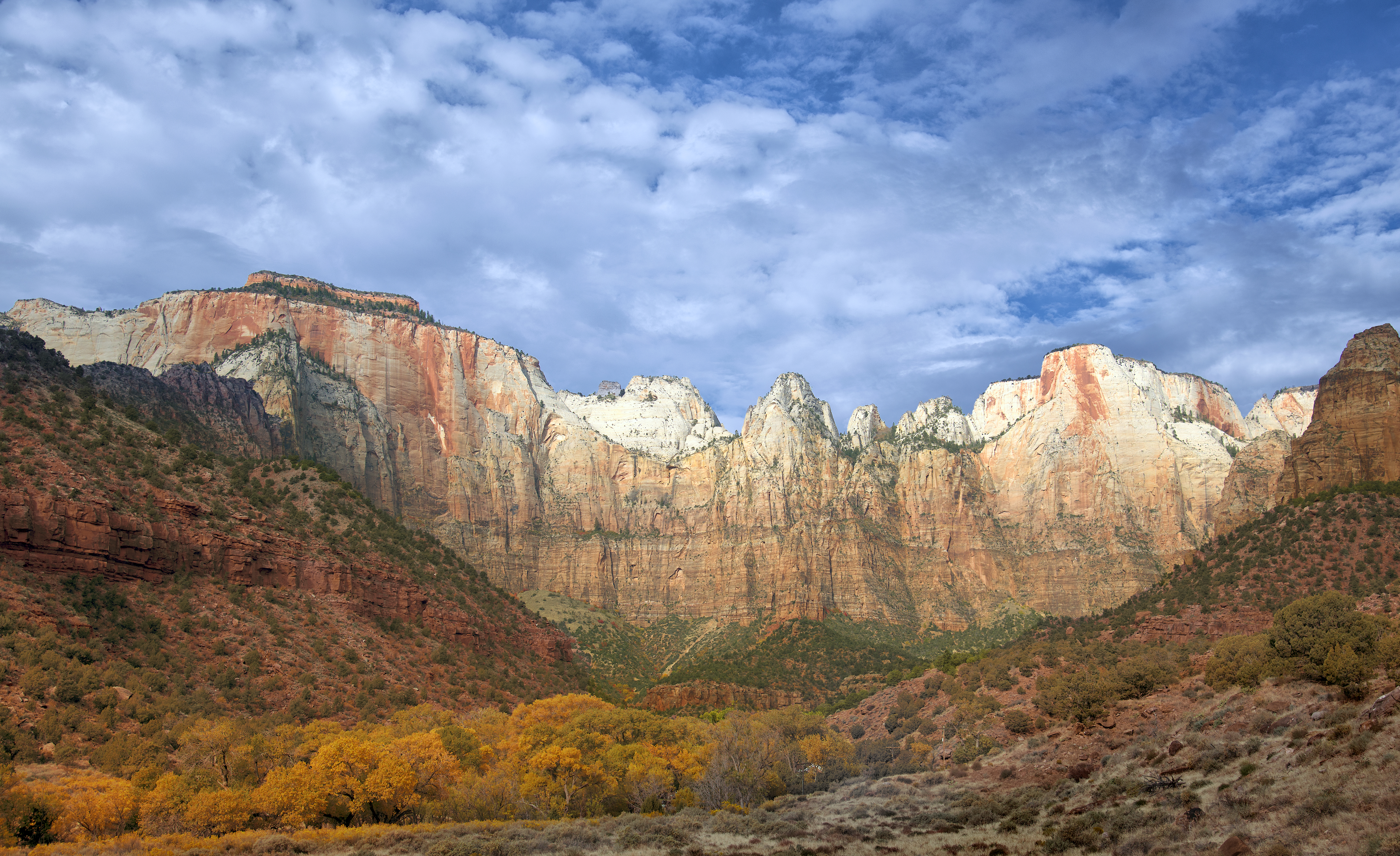
The West Temple (left), The Sundial, The Witch Head, Altar of Sacrifice (right)

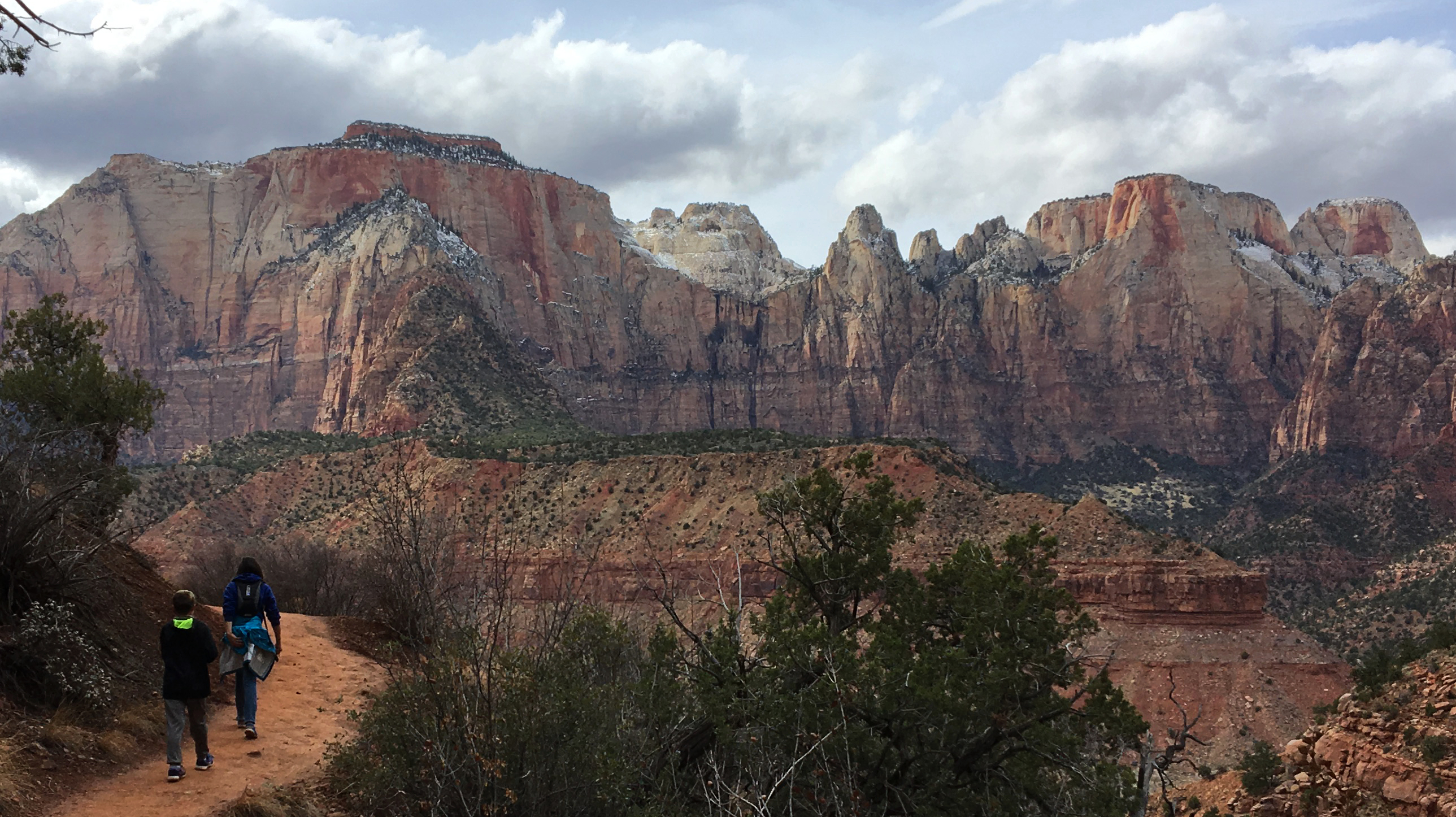
The West Temple (left), The Sundial, The Witch Head, Altar of Sacrifice (right)

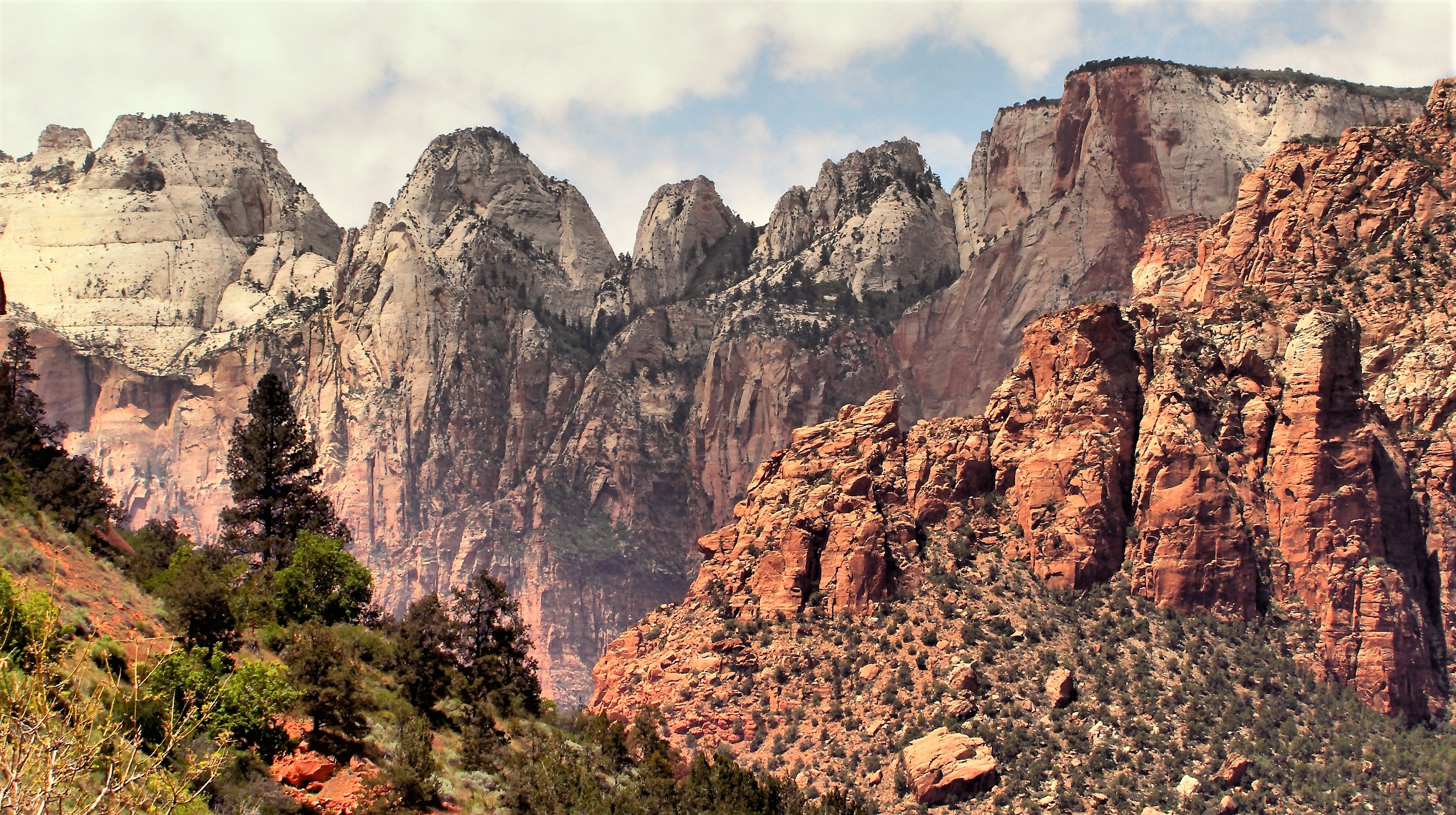
Towers of the Virgin. Left to right:The Sundial, The Witch Head, Broken Tooth, Rotten Tooth, Altar of Sacrifice (upper right).

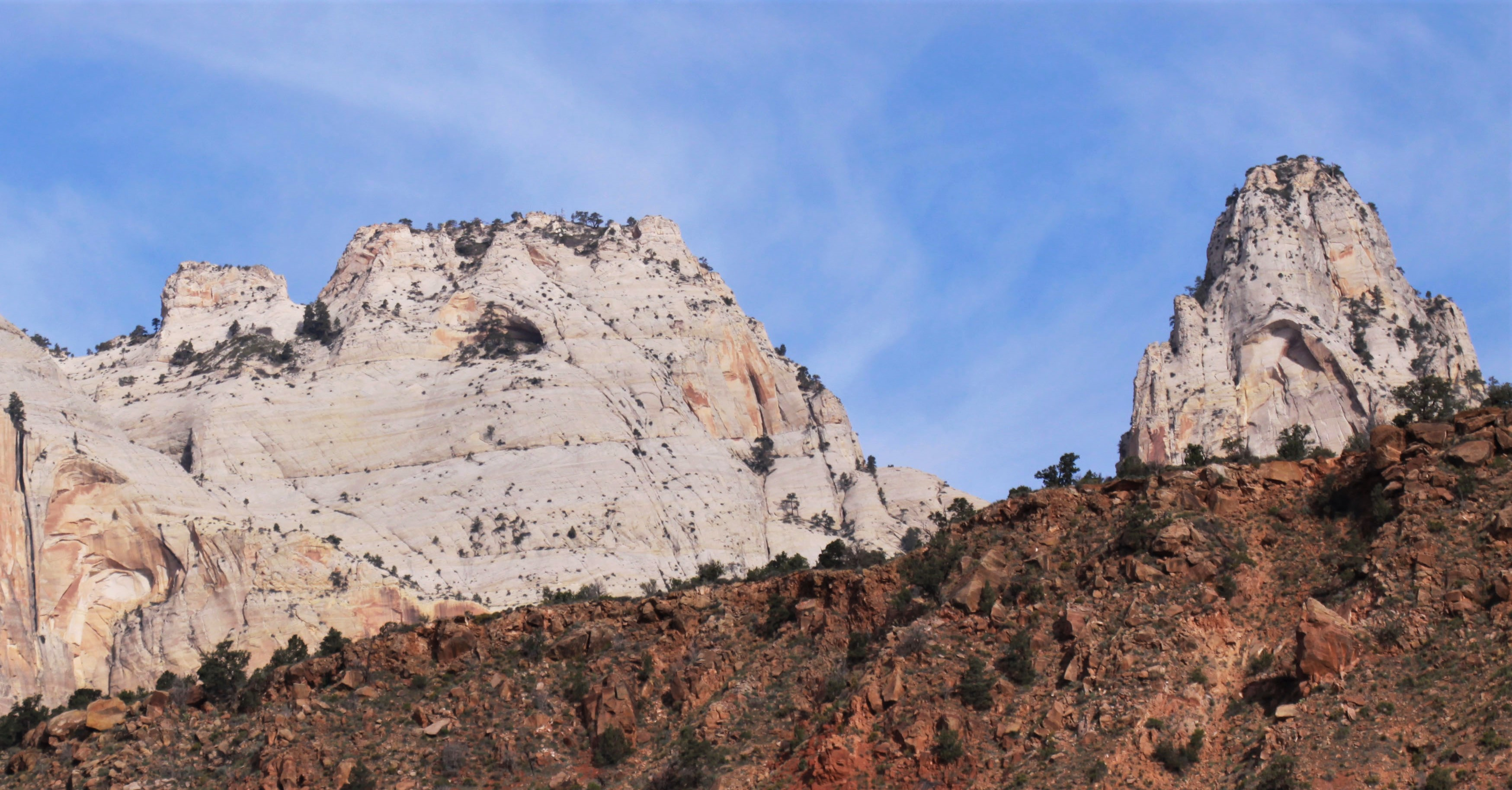
The Sundial (left) and The Witch Head (right)

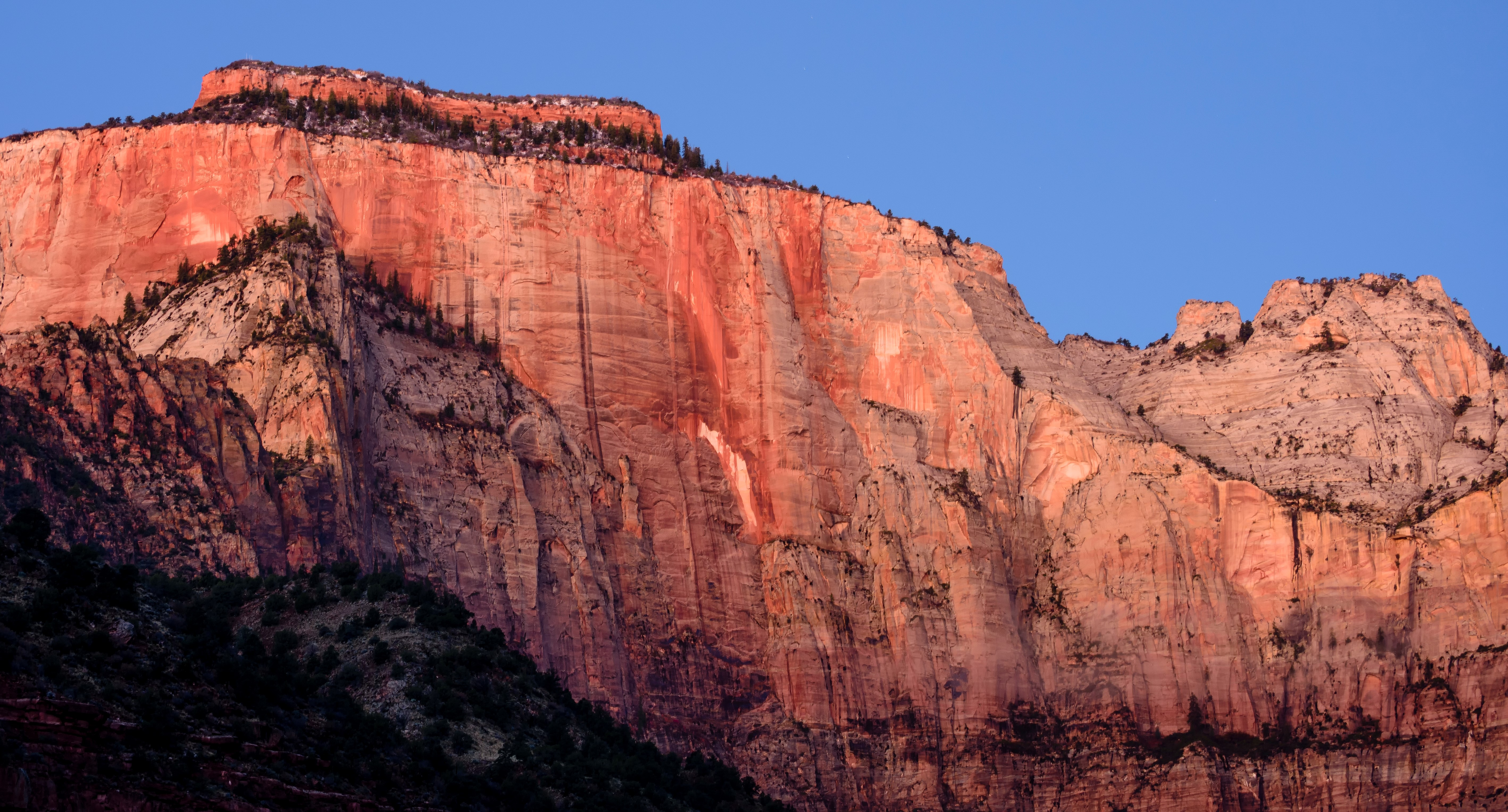
The West Temple (left), The Sundial (right)

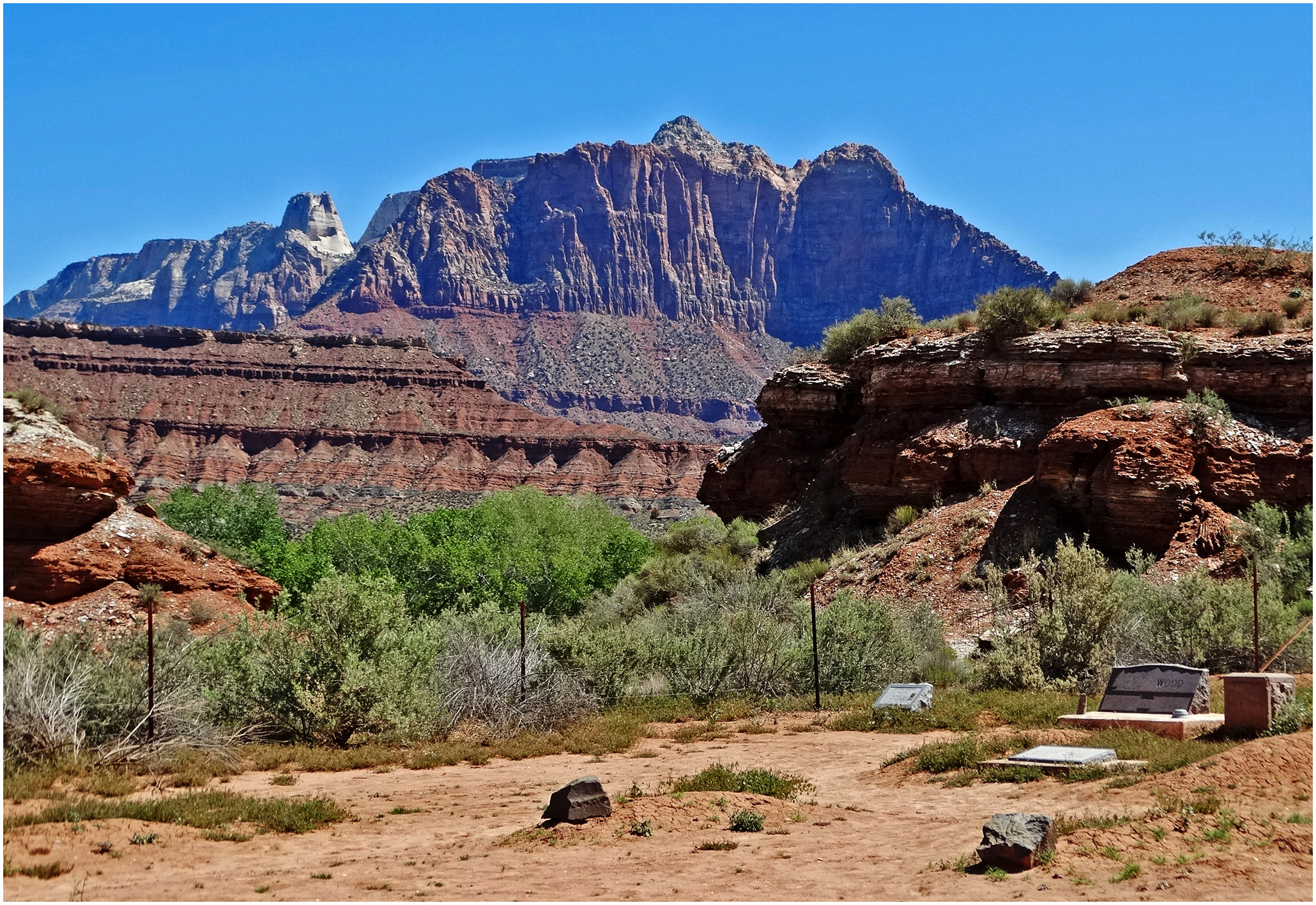
Mt. Kinesava (centered), The Sundial to left, seen from Grafton cemetery

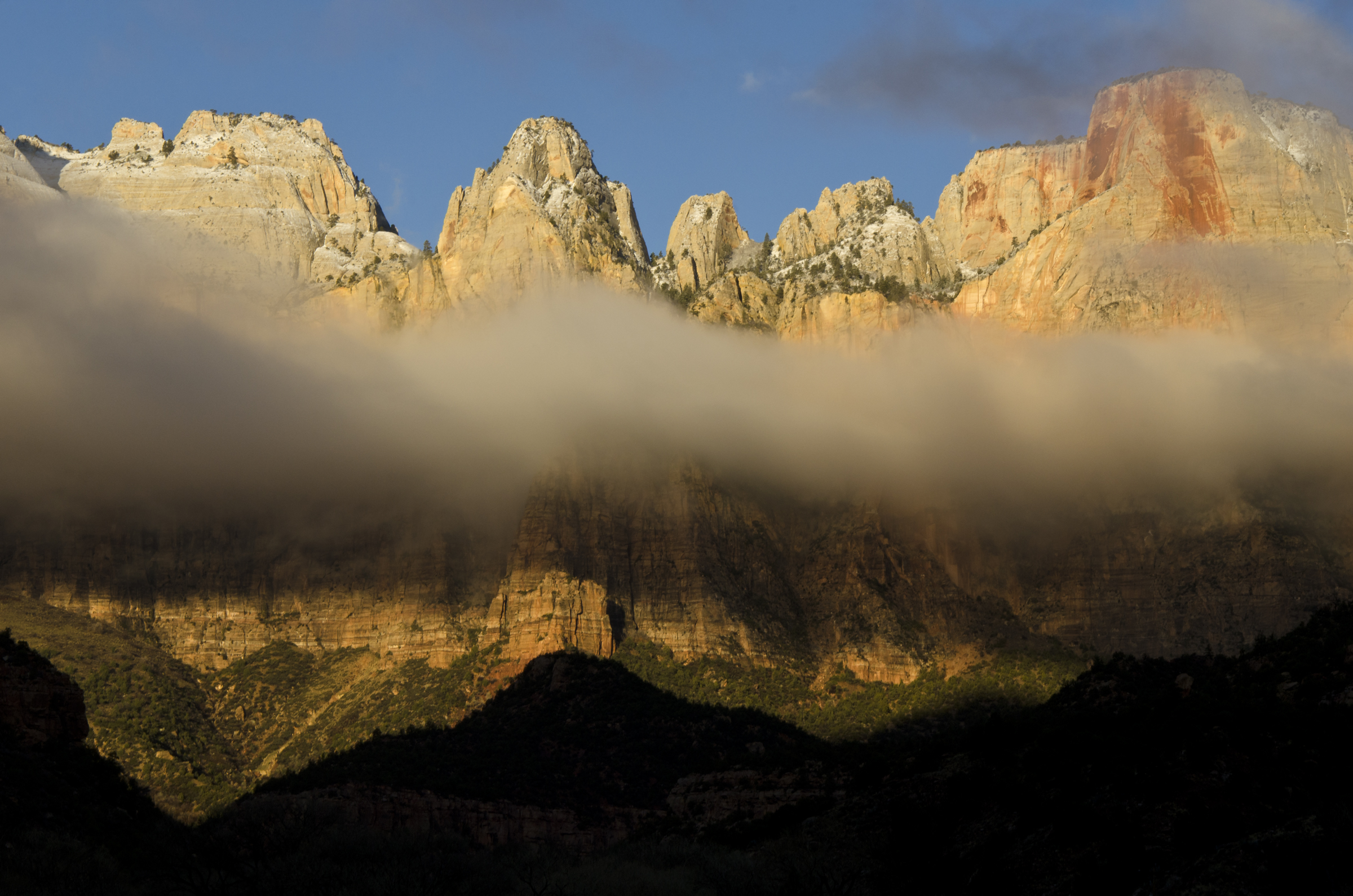
The Sundial (left), The Witch Head, Broken Tooth, Rotten Tooth, Altar of Sacrifice.

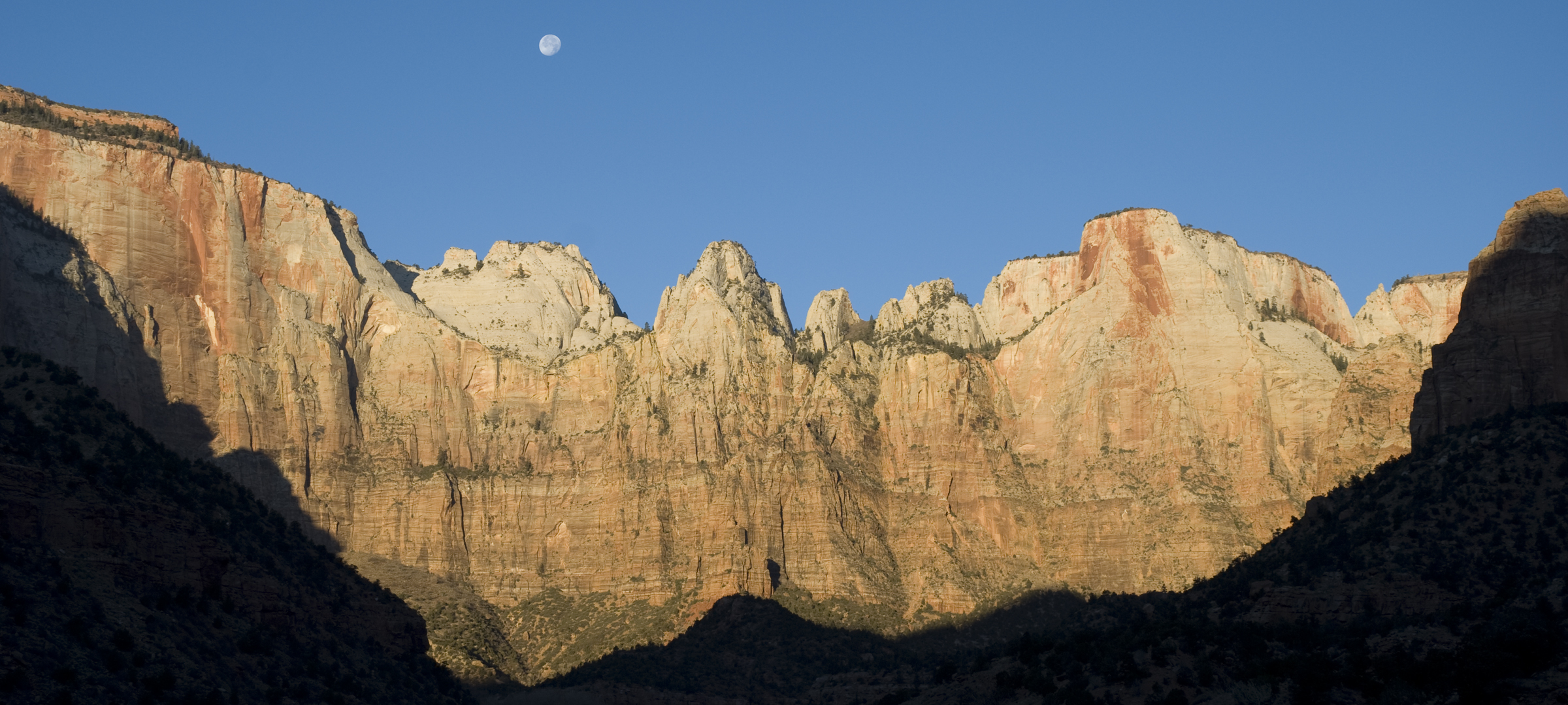
Moon over The Sundial

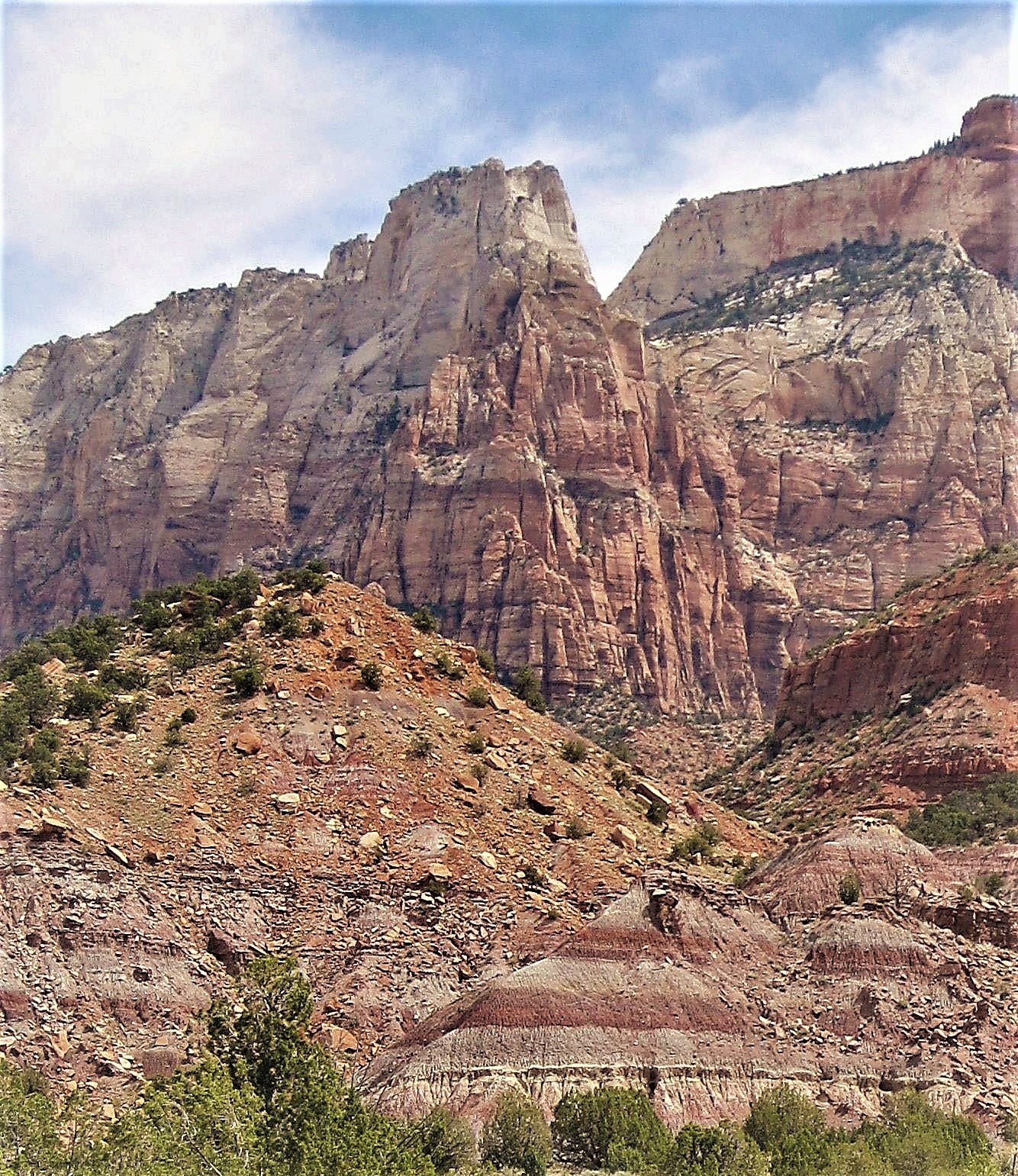
The Sundial from Chinle Trail

== See also ==
- List of mountains in Utah
- Geology of the Zion and Kolob canyons area
- Colorado Plateau
