= The West Temple =

Mountain in the state of Utah

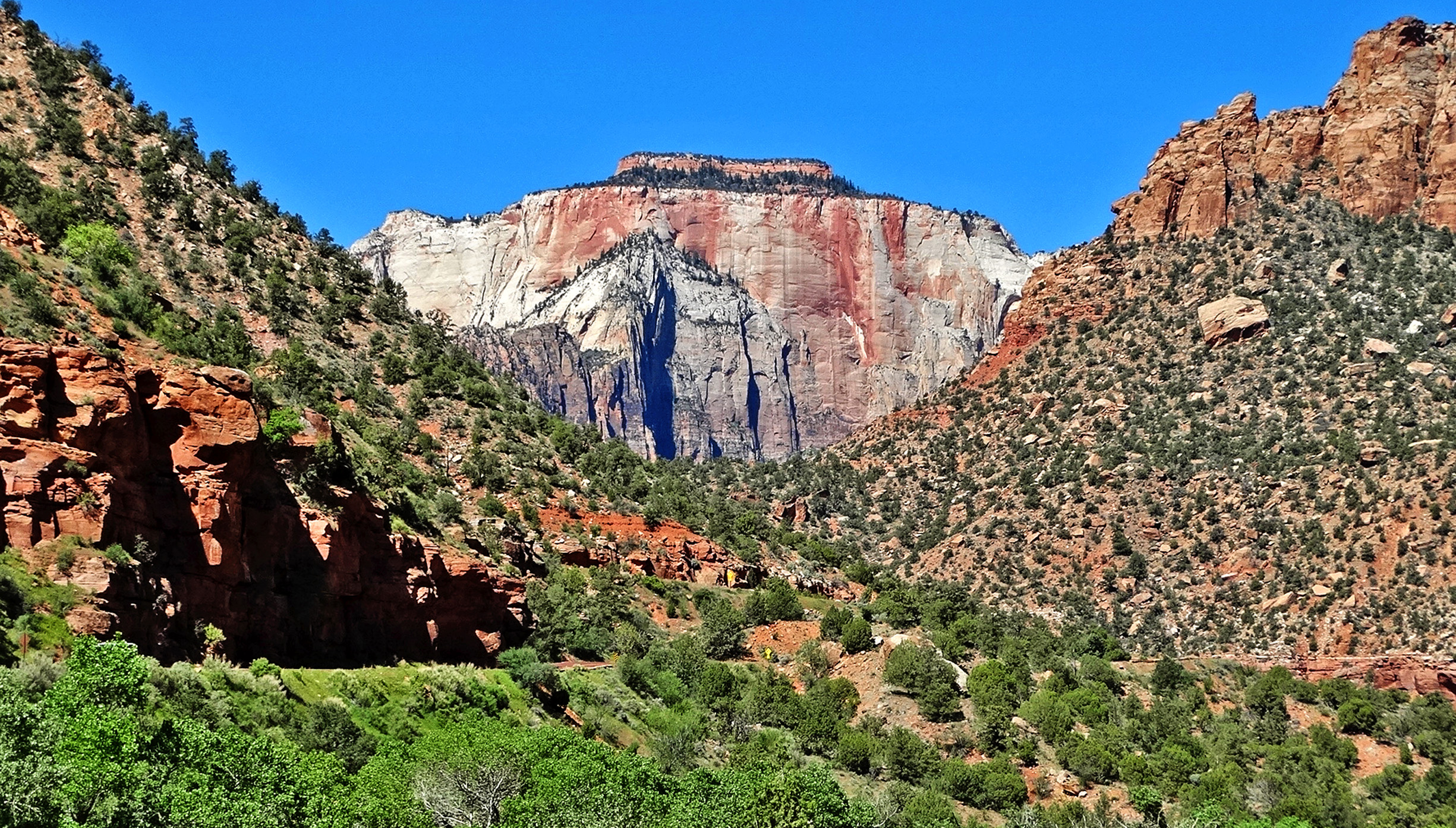
- East aspect of The West Temple

Highest point
- Elevation: 7,810 ft (2,380 m)
- Prominence: 1,680 ft (510 m)
- Isolation: 10.66 mi (17.16 km)
- Coordinates: 37°12′39″N 113°01′15″W

Geography
- Location within Utah Location within the United States
- Country: United States
- State: Utah
- County: Washington
- Protected area: Zion National Park
- Parent range: Colorado Plateau
- Topo map: USGS Springdale West

Geology
- Rock age: Jurassic
- Rock type: Navajo Sandstone

Climbing
- First ascent: 1933
- Easiest route: class 5.6 climbing

The West Temple is a prominent 7,810-foot (2,380 m) mountain summit composed of Navajo Sandstone in Zion National Park in Washington County of Utah, United States. The West Temple, the highest feature in Zion Canyon, was originally called "Temp-o-i-tin-car-ur", meaning "Mountain Without a Trail" by the Paiute people. It was called "Steamboat Mountain" by local Mormon settlers before 1934, when the USGS officially changed it to its present name, which was applied by John Wesley Powell during his explorations in 1872. West Temple is situated two miles northwest of Springdale, Utah, one mile northeast of Mount Kinesava, and two miles west of the park headquarters. It is one of the notable landmarks in the park. The nearest higher peak is Windy Peak, 10.46 miles (16.83 km) to the north. Precipitation runoff from the mountain drains into tributaries of the Virgin River.

== Climbing Routes ==
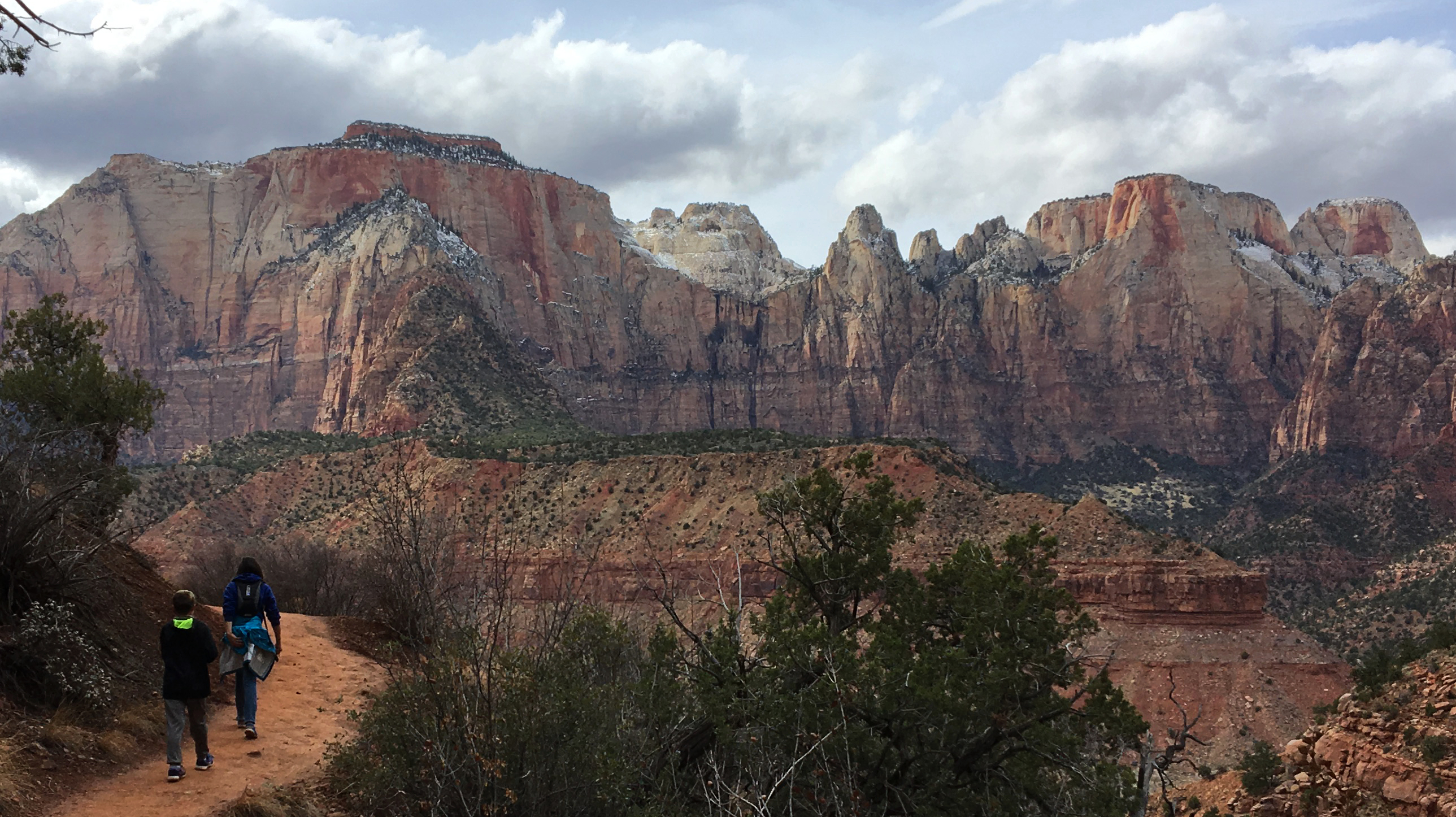
The West Temple (left) with Altar of Sacrifice (right)

Climbing Routes on The West Temple

- Southwest Ridge: class 5.6, 10 pitches
- Back Where It All Begins: class 5.11a, 16 pitches
- Big Lebowski: class 5.11a/b, 21 pitches
- Lovelace: class 5.10, 9 pitches
- Big Lie: class 5.10+, 2 pitches

== Geology ==
The upper white cliffs are composed of Navajo Sandstone, which in some places exhibit reddish staining caused by hematite (iron oxide), the source of which is the Temple Cap Formation caprock at the summit. Lower slopes and ledges are composed of Kayenta Formation, Moenave Formation, Chinle Formation, and Moenkopi Formation.

== Climate ==
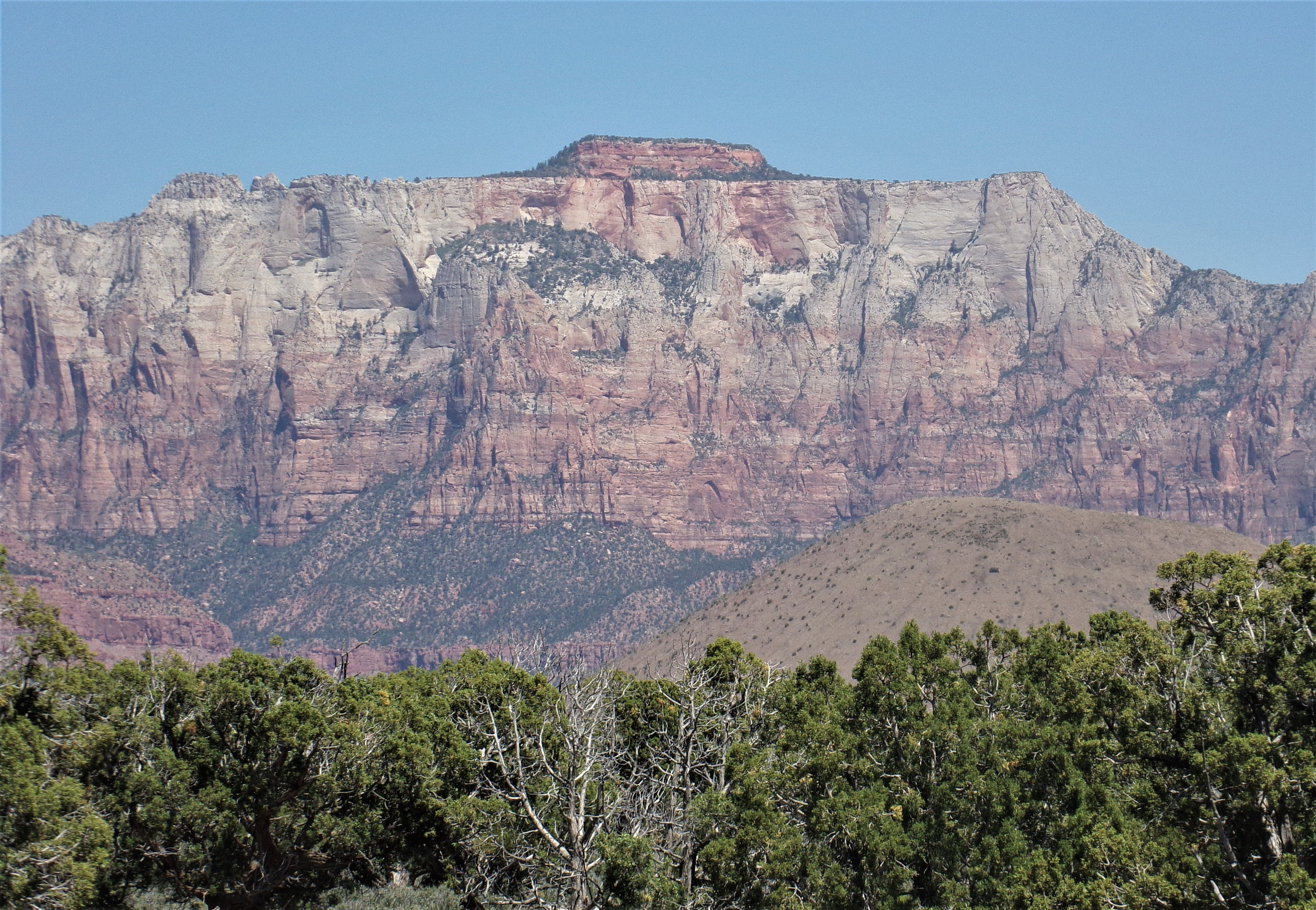
West aspect of The West Temple

Spring and fall are the most favorable seasons to visit this feature. According to the Köppen climate classification system, it is located in a Cold semi-arid climate zone, which is defined by the coldest month having an average mean temperature below 32 °F (0 °C), and at least 50% of the total annual precipitation being received during the spring and summer. This desert climate receives less than 10 inches (250 millimeters) of annual rainfall, and snowfall is generally light during the winter.

== See also ==
- Altar of Sacrifice
- Geology of the Zion and Kolob canyons area
- Mount Kinesava
- The Sundial
- Three Marys
- The Witch Head
