= Bee Hive (peak) =

Mountain in Zion National Park, Utah, USA

Bee Hive Peak
- Bee Hive
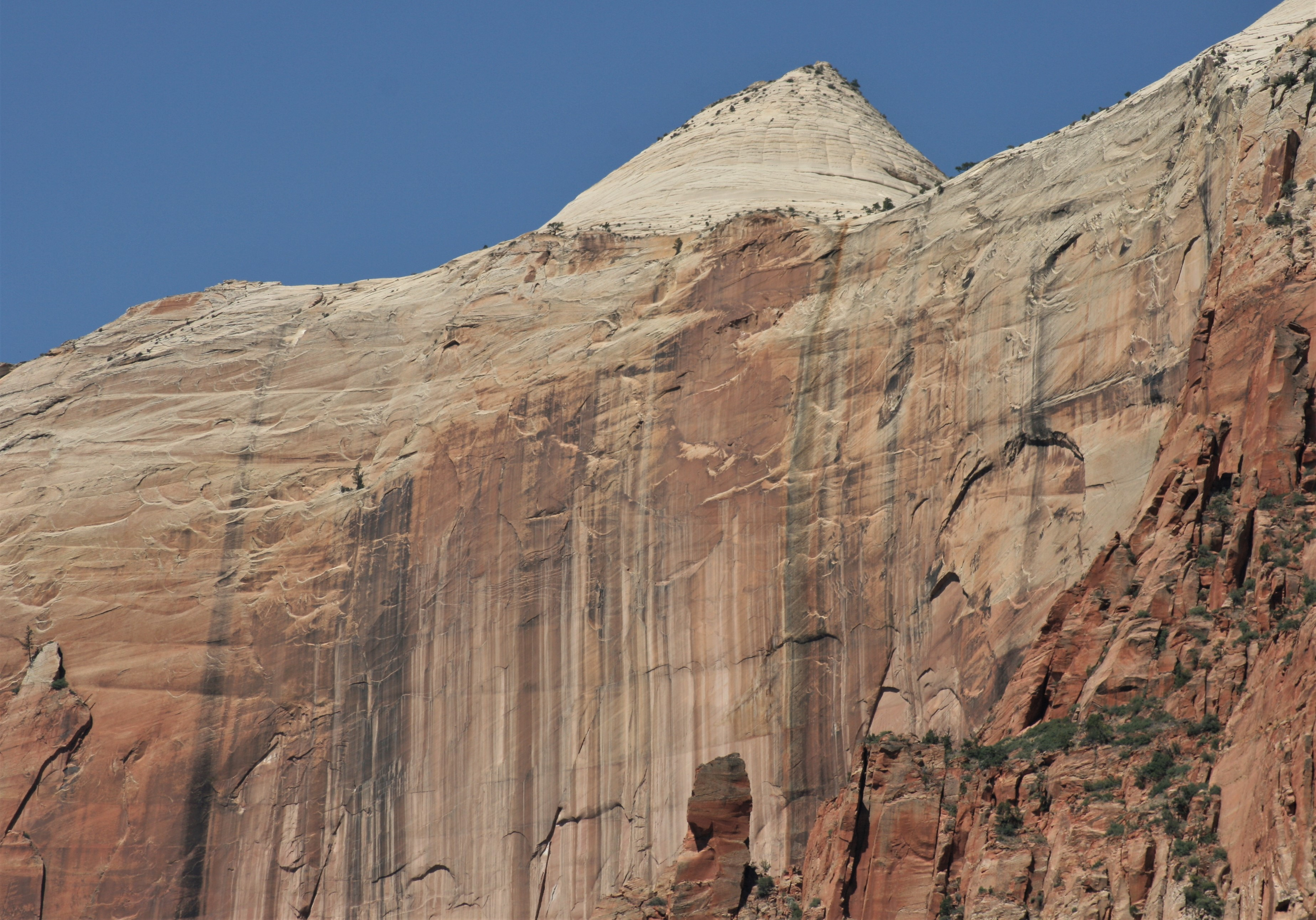
- Bee Hive Peak and The Streaked Wall

Highest point
- Elevation: 6,904 ft (2,104 m)
- Prominence: 224 ft (68 m)
- Isolation: 0.47 mi (0.76 km)
- Coordinates: 37°13′28″N 112°59′15″W

Geography
- Location within Utah Location within the United States
- Country: United States
- State: Utah
- County: Washington
- Protected area: Zion National Park
- Parent range: Colorado Plateau
- Topo map: USGS Springdale East

Geology
- Rock type: Navajo sandstone

Climbing
- Easiest route: class 5.7 Climbing

Bee Hive is a 6,904 feet (2,104 m) Navajo Sandstone mountain in Zion National Park in Washington County, Utah, United States, that is part of the Towers of the Virgin.

== Description ==
Bee Hive is located north of the park headquarters at the south entrance to Zion Canyon. The east face of Bee Hive, named The Streaked Wall, rises 2,900 feet (880 m) above the floor of Zion Canyon, and is a venue for big wall climbing. Neighbors include Altar of Sacrifice and Meridian Tower to the west, and The Sentinel to the northeast. The peak's descriptive name is for the beehive shape of the summit. This name was officially adopted in 1934 by the U.S. Board on Geographic Names. Precipitation runoff from the mountain drains into the North Fork Virgin River.

== Climate ==
Spring and fall are the most favorable seasons to see Bee Hive Peak. According to the Köppen climate classification system, it is located in a Cold semi-arid climate zone, which is defined by the coldest month having an average mean temperature below 32 °F (0 °C), and at least 50% of the total annual precipitation being received during the spring and summer. This desert climate receives less than 10 inches (250 millimeters) of annual rainfall, and snowfall is generally light during the winter.

== Climbing Regulations ==
A bivouac permit is required from the park visitor center for any climbs expected to last overnight.

== Gallery ==
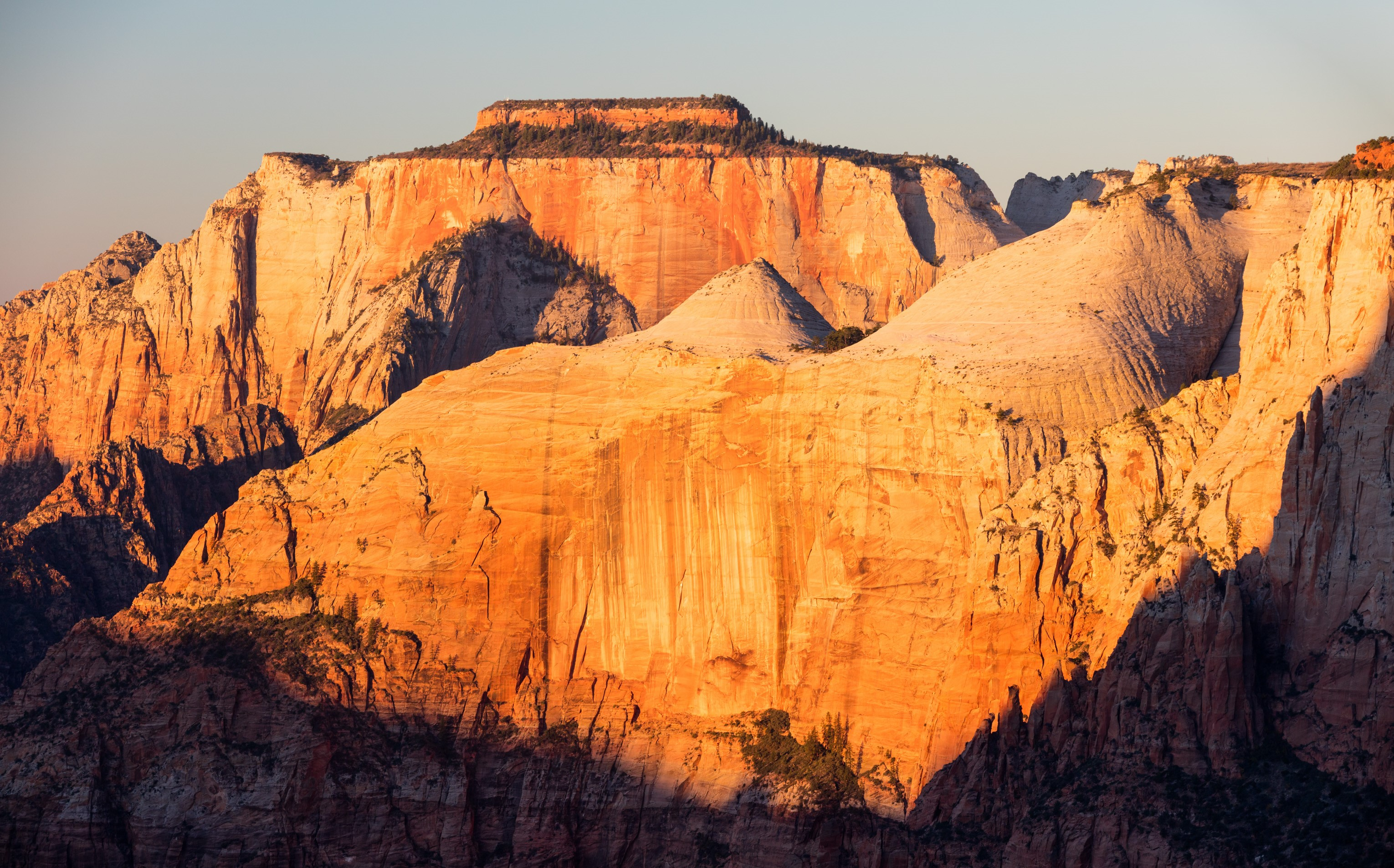
The West Temple behind Bee Hive at sunrise

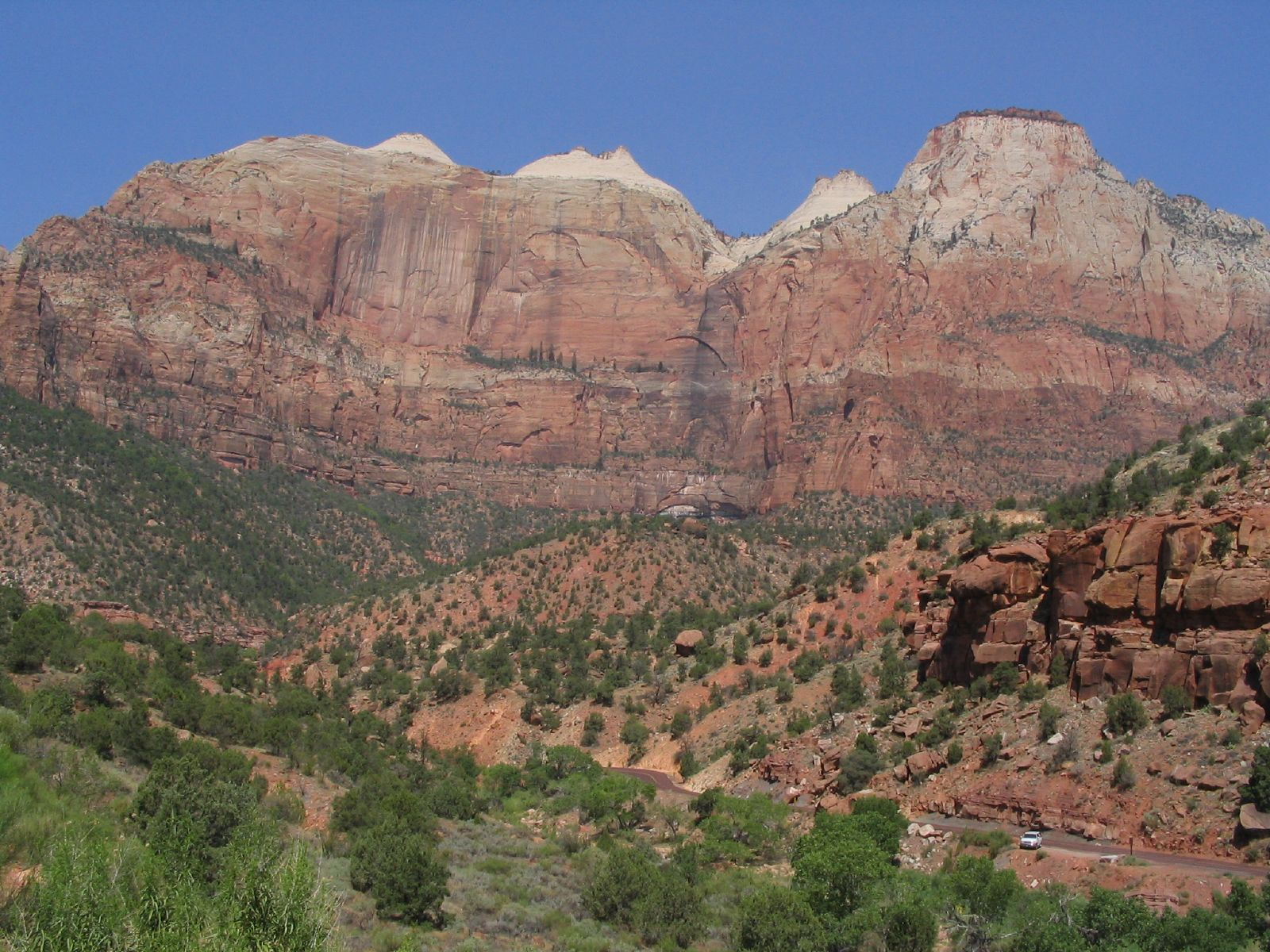
Bee Hive Peak (left) with The Streaked Wall featured. Note the white Navajo Sandstone of the beehive shaped summit. The peak to right is The Sentinel.

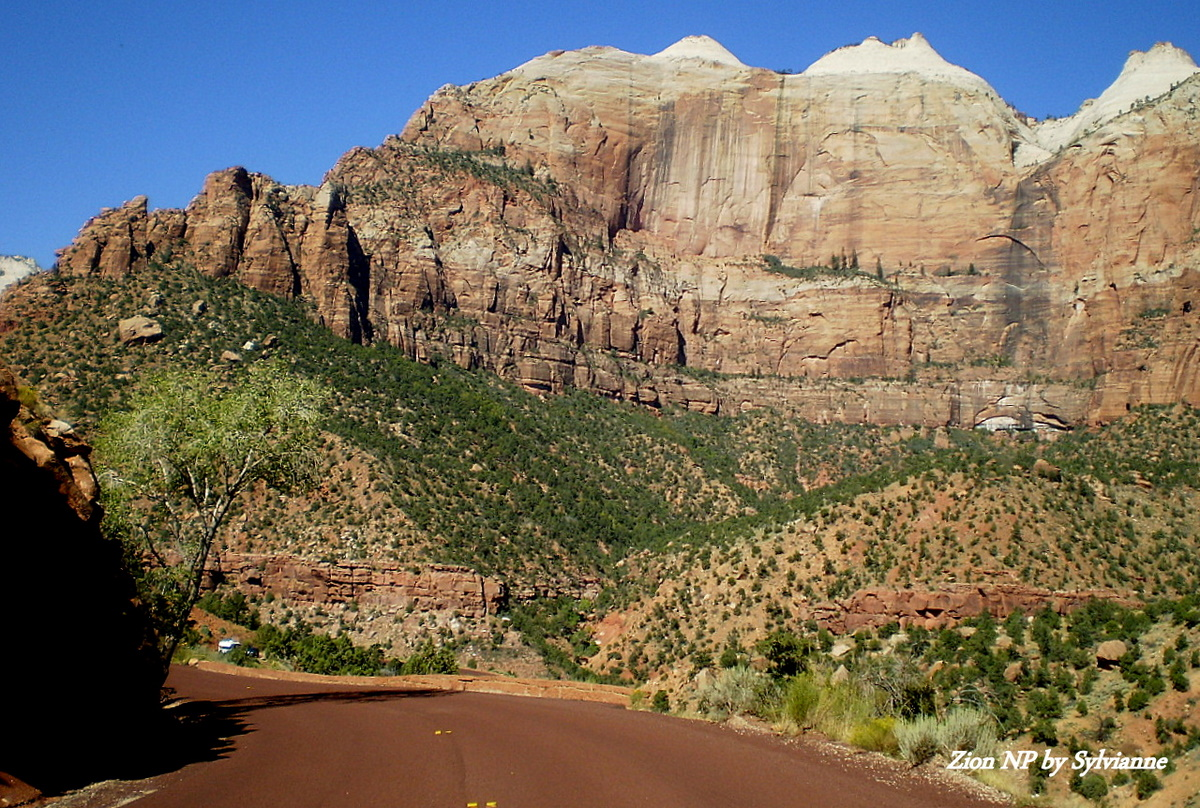
Bee Hive Peak with The Streaked Wall

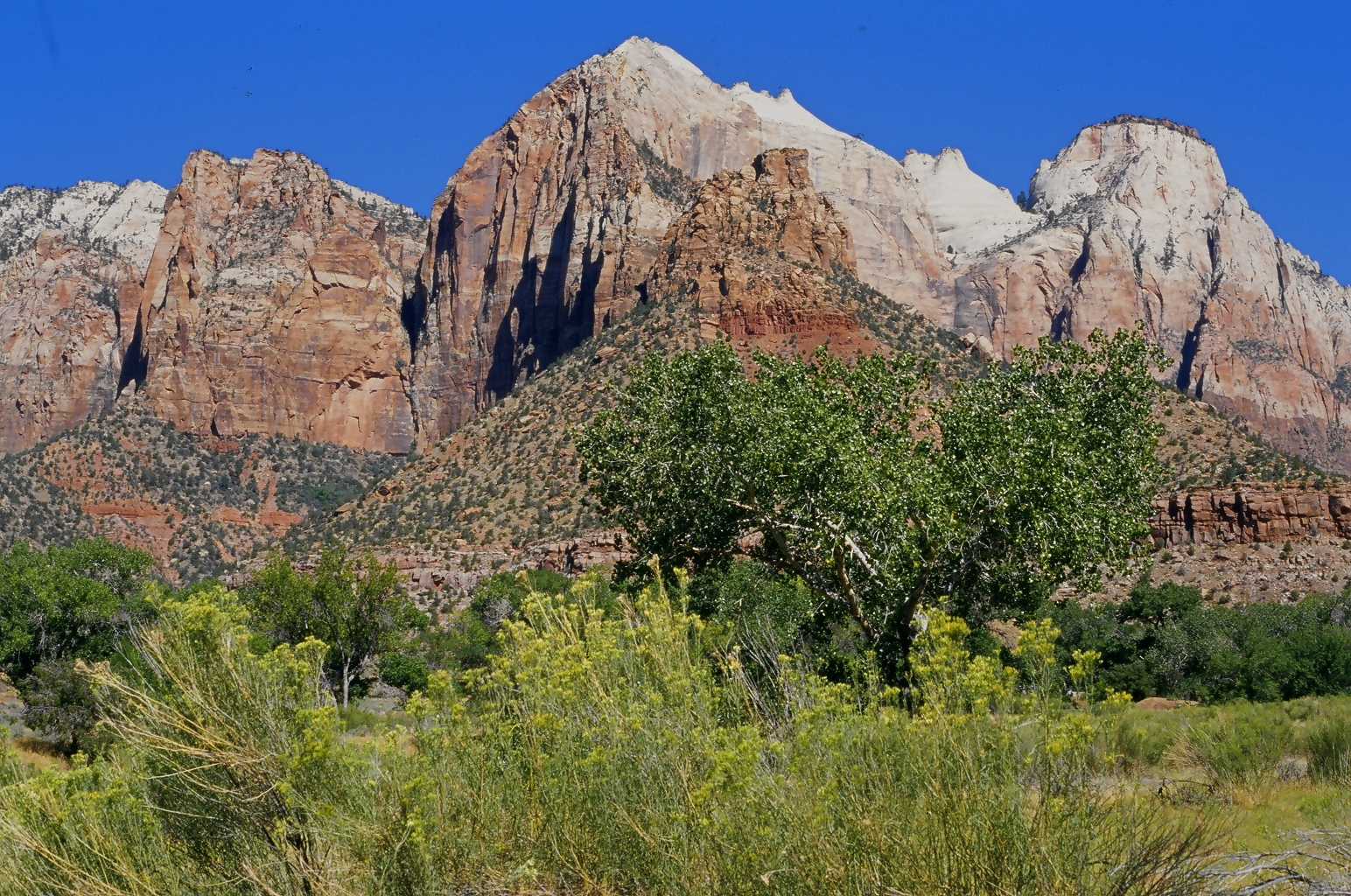
Bee Hive Peak seen from museum

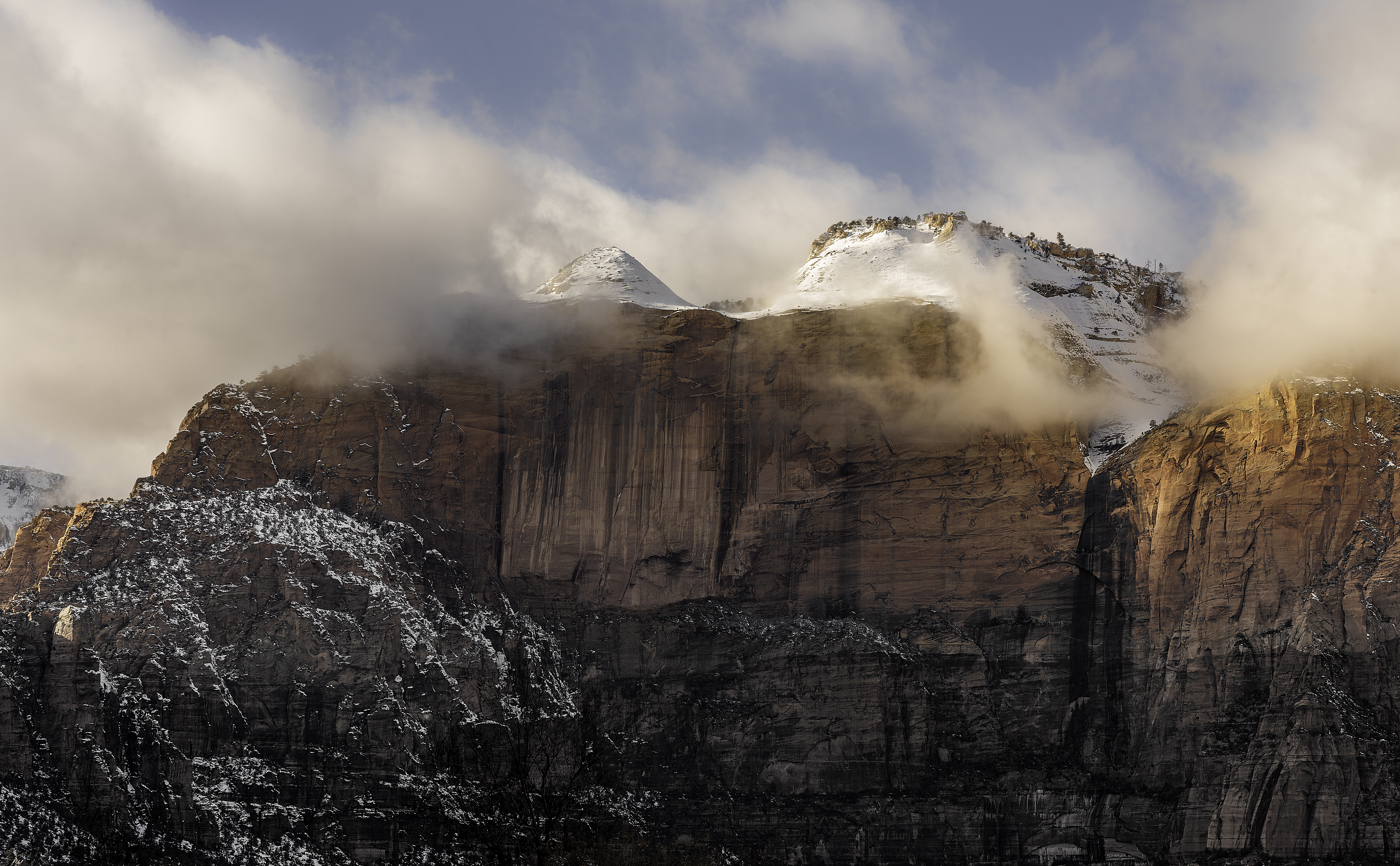
The Streaked Wall

== See also ==
- List of mountains of Utah
- Geology of the Zion and Kolob canyons area
- Colorado Plateau
