= San Juan Southern Paiute Tribe of Arizona =

Group of Native Americans

Coordinates: 36.1290°N 111.2387°W

Pah'utsing

Total population
- 265

Regions with significant populations
- United States (Arizona, Utah)

Languages
- English, Uto-Aztecan, Southern Paiute Language

Religion
- Traditional tribal religion, previously Ghost Dance

Related ethnic groups
- other Southern Paiute tribes (Kaibab, Kaiparowtis, Panguitch, Shivwits, Moapa, Paranigets, and Panaca)

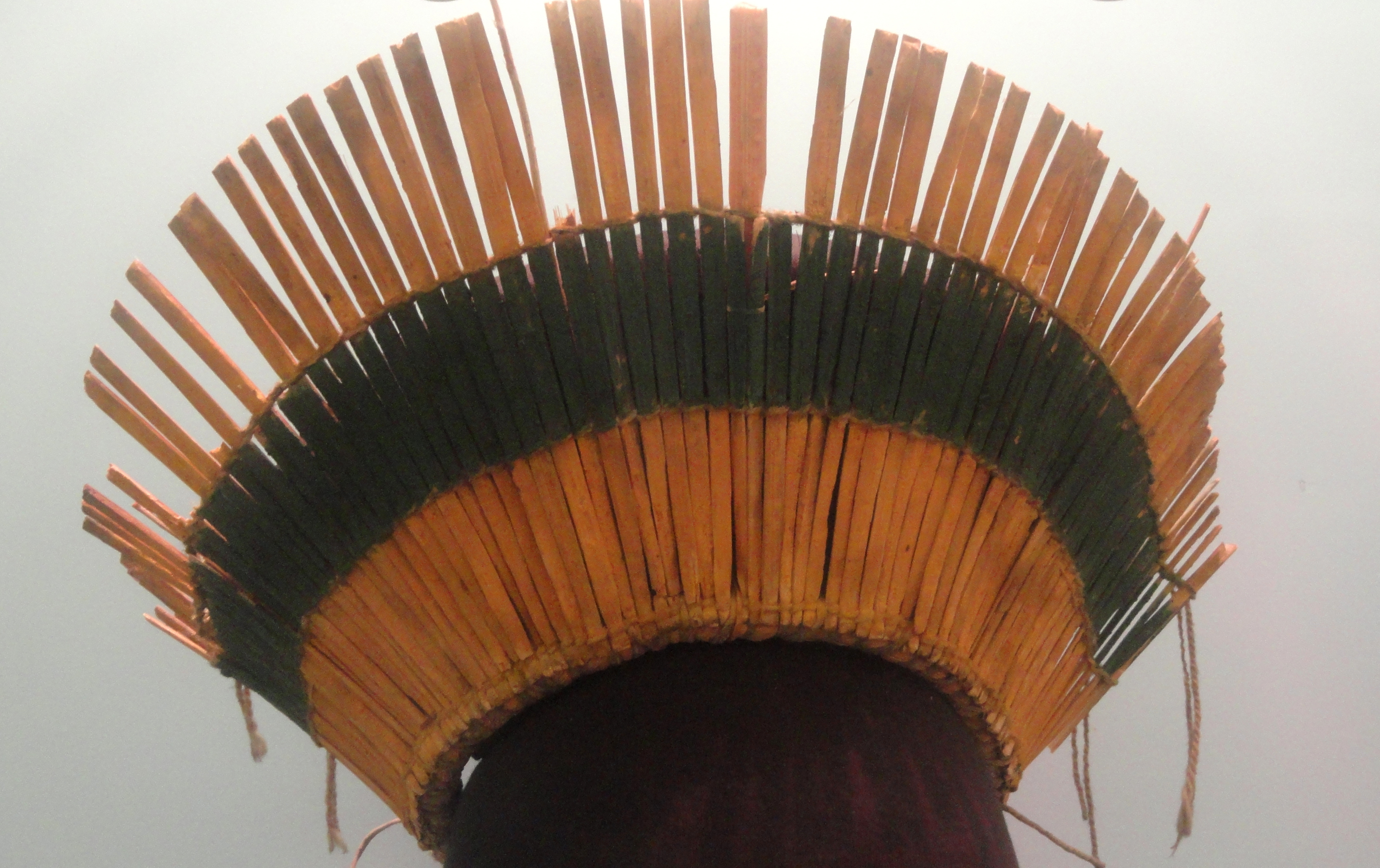
San Juan Paiute headdress

The San Juan Southern Paiute Tribe of Arizona is a federally recognized tribe of Southern Paiute Indians in Coconino County, Arizona.

== History ==
The San Juan Southern Paiutes lived east of the Grand Canyon, in lands bounded by the San Juan River to the north, Colorado River to the west, and Little Colorado River to the south for centuries. Although they lived by the Hopi and Navajo people, the San Juan Southern Paiutes maintained their own distinct language, traditions, and culture. Several of their communities are on what is now the Navajo Reservation in Arizona and Utah.

== Today ==
The San Juan Southern Paiute Tribe of Arizona is headquartered in Tuba City, Arizona. Their primary communities are two clusters, the southern area including Willow Springs, Hidden Springs, Rough Rock Point, Tuba City and Cow Springs. The northern area includes Paiute Canyon, Arizona and Navajo Mountain in Utah. Some members reside in White Mesa and Blanding, Utah. Currently the tribe is in litigation to restore their land base.

The tribe is governed by a seven-person tribal council, called the Shuupara`api.

Tribal members are primarily earning their incomes through livestock and subsistence farming. Fine basket weaving is also a common occupation.

Their annual powwow takes place on the second weekend of June and a San Juan Southern Paiute Family Reunion takes place every second week of August.

== Controversy ==
Former tribal president and council member Evelyn James was found guilty of stealing of almost $300,000 of tribal funds and money laundering. She was sentenced to two years in federal prison.

== Sources ==
- Pritzker, Barry M. A Native American Encyclopedia: History, Culture, and Peoples. Oxford: Oxford University Press, 2000. ISBN 978-0-19-513877-1.
