= Tony Tillohash =

American politician

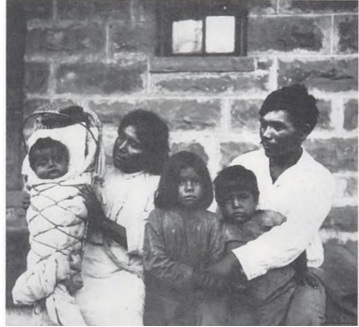
- Tilohash and his family

Chairman of the Shivwits Band of Paiutes

Personal details
- Born: Kaibab Indian Reservation, Utah
- Spouse: A Shivwits Paiute woman
- Education: Carlisle Indian Industrial School
- Profession: Worked with linguist Edward Sapir to describe the Southern Paiute language
- Fluent speaker: Southern Paiute language

Tony Tillohash (born on Kaibab, Utah) was a Paiute Indian who worked with linguist Edward Sapir to describe the Southern Paiute language.

In 1910, Tillohash was removed from his home in Utah to the Carlisle Indian Industrial School in Carlisle, Pennsylvania. There Tillohash began working with Sapir, then employed at the nearby University of Pennsylvania.

Together they recorded many Paiute songs, and Sapir describes Tillohash's musical memory with some amazement:

Despite his five years' absence from home, Tony's musical memory was quite remarkable. Besides the myth-songs [i.e., the myth recitatives] spoken of here, over two hundred other songs of various kinds (three or four varieties of "cry" or mourning songs, bear-dance songs, round-dance songs, ghost-dance songs, medicine songs, gambling songs, scalp songs, and others less easy to classify) were obtained from him.

The work ultimately led to a book-length description of the language, now considered a classic in linguistics.

After his studies at Carlisle, Tillohash returned to Utah and married a Shivwits Paiute woman named Bessie Simon. Together they raised a family and ran a cattle ranch. He was elected chairman of the Shivwits Band of Paiutes. He and Stewart Snow observed the changes that the Great Depression and the Indian New Deal brought to their tribe, when they wrote in 1940: "For the past six years we have depended largely on the various Federal Relief Agencies. Our farms have been somewhat neglected." He served on the tribal council through the 1940s.

== See also ==
- Traditional narratives (Native California)
