= Santa Clara River =

Santa Clara River may refer to:

- Santa Clara River (California), a river in Southern California
- Santa Clara River (Utah), a river in Utah
