= Shivwits Band of Paiutes =

Band of the Paiute Indian Tribe in southwestern Utah, United States

The Shivwits Band of Paiutes is a sovereign, federally recognized tribe located in southwestern Utah. The Shivwits Band is one of five Bands comprising the inter-Tribal government of the Paiute Indian Tribe of Utah.

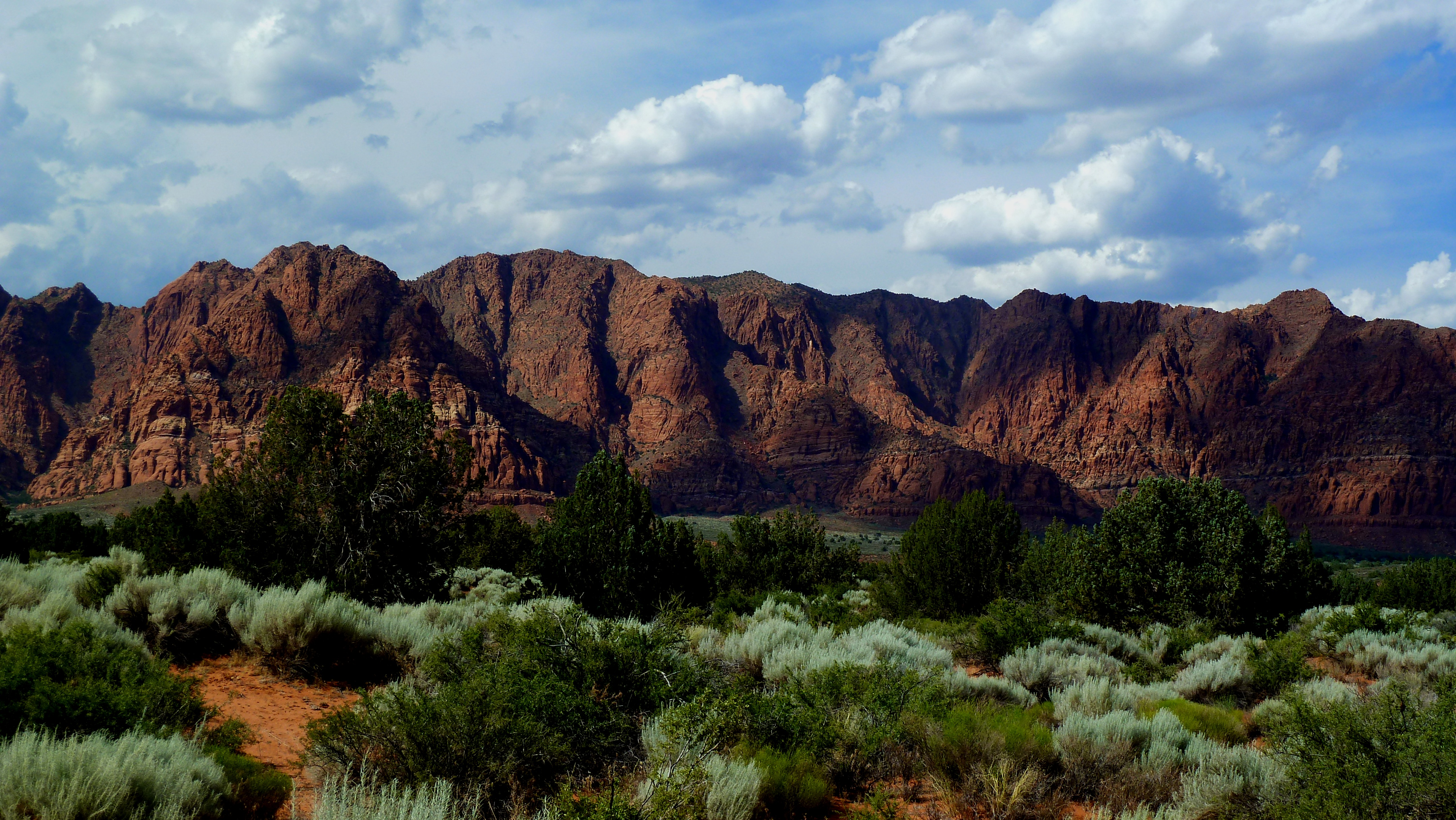
Geology in the Shivwits reservation near Ivins, Utah

The Band is headquartered in Ivins and the unincorporated community of Shivwits, located in Washington County, Utah along Old Highway 91. Located in the community are a health clinic, a community center, and a gas station with a convenience store. Economic development is an ongoing political challenge for the band, and in the dry desert basin water, lease agreements play an important role in economic survival. Future plans for the Shivwits reservation include building a gymnasium and cultural center.

Every year, the Paiute Restoration Gathering celebrates the reinstatement of federal recognition after the five bands of Utah Paiutes were terminated. Paiutes and their inner-tribal members all gather at an annual pow-wow, where they celebrate their tribal traditions by dancing and singing and performing ceremonies to help educate their youth about who they are and where they come from.

The current band chairperson is Carmen Clark.

== Name ==
Shivwits comes from a Southern Paiute word, sipicimi. The word may be based on the prefix sibi-, meaning "east" or si-vints, meaning "people who live in the east." It is also spelled Shivwitz, Shi'-vwits, She-bits, Sübü'ts, and Sebit. The Shivwits Plateau in Arizona is named after the tribe. Today the Shivwits Band of Paiute Indians of Utah identify as See’veets eng, meaning "Whitish Earth People".

== History ==
=== Pre-European contact ===
The Shivwits Paiutes settled in Utah around 1100 BC, migrating into lands abandoned by the Ancestral Puebloans, formerly known as Anasazi. Shivwits people were hunter-gatherers who sought after berries, roots and pine nuts and hunted game such as rabbits and deer. In contrast, excavations of two Ancestral Puebloan sites near the Santa Clara River and dated to ca 900–1150 provide evidence of Ancestral Puebloan practice of garden cultivation (horticulture) such as wheat grains and maize cob and kernel fragments, These early peoples were farmers living along the and the Virgin River and cultivated crops of corn, squash, melons, gourds, sunflowers, and, after European contact, winter wheat. The also practiced irrigation agriculture along the banks of the Virgin and Santa Clara rivers.

The people in the Shivwits Band of Paiutes camped together in family groupings. They had a nomadic mobile lifestyle and moved around frequently. For shelter, many created cone-shaped wickiups to live in. Later, some used tepees. In the spring and summer they would gather, plant, and hunt food in preparation for winter. After growing season was over in the fall they would gather together to celebrate marriages and have dances. (Other major celebrations include the pine nut harvest at the spring fish spawn.) In the winter they told stories of the Wolf and the Coyote, and recounted the history of their people.

It is likely that the Shivwits Plateau was also once a source of ceramic pottery that contributed to a thriving ceramic trade system that linked regions around southern Nevada and northwestern Arizona. These Shivwits wares were composed of iron rich, dark brown or red ceramic materials, as well as crushed Moapa Gray Ware shards, all of which support the Shivwits production of these Native American ceramics. With near total consistency, these Shivwits wares were most commonly characterized by their style of being very large jars, large enough that it would take one person to transport just one jar. This ceramic trade, however, disappeared under unknown circumstances and only the historical evidence remains in support of its existence.

=== White settlement ===
The Domínguez–Escalante expedition of 1776 was most likely the Shivwits' first contact with Europeans. Fur trader Jedediah Smith created a route to California directly through Paiute territory. The 19th century brought non-Native trappers, traders, and settlers to the area. The newly introduced livestock had a negative effect on the area's delicate ecology. Utes and Navajos often captured Paiute women and children and sold them to European-Americans as slaves.

Spurred by the era of rapid expansion of settlers in the mid 19th century in Southern Utah, white settlement of the land marked the end of the Native American sovereignty and traditional lifestyle. By 1858, these settlers, predominantly Mormons, permanently settled on Paiute lands, putting an end to the Shivwits' traditional lifestyle. These settlers colonized many places that the Natives used for foraging, which resulted in many Natives facing problems with starvation. New diseases were also introduced to the Native Americans, whose epidemics ultimately killed 90 percent of some groups, drastically reducing their population. As a result, many Natives were pressed by the effects of poverty and vulnerability, and often, many women and children would turn to roles of servitude to the new settlers in order to support themselves.

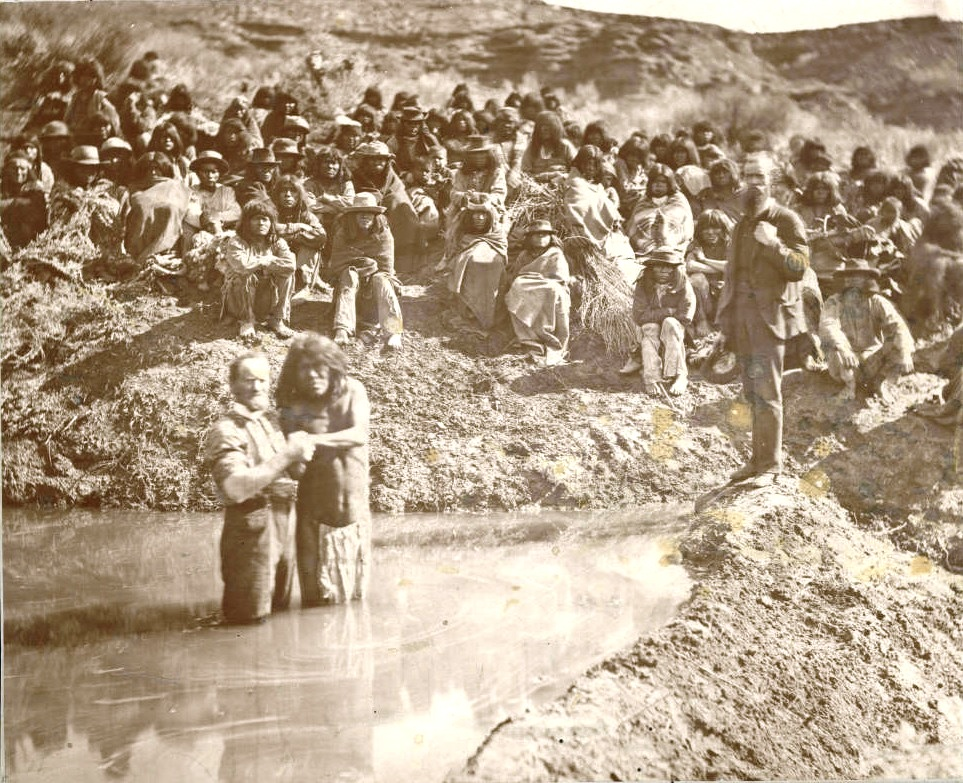
C. R. Savage's photograph: Member of the Shivwits Band, in 1875, being baptized by Mormon Missionaries.

The settlement of Mormons also had unique assimilating consequences upon the Shivwits through the intensive proselytizing efforts of the Mormon settlers. C. R. Savage, travelling with Mormon missionaries, captured the mass baptisms of Shivwits on March 19, 1875, through photography, and his photo has since been famously used to represent the expansion of early white Mormon settlers and their positive and negative impact on Indian society. Though uncertain, most reports agree that at least 160 Shivwits were baptized by Mormon missionaries—men, women, and children up to 60 years old. Within Savage's historic photograph, is pictured Chief Qui-Tuss, or “Burning Fire,” standing in the water, preparing to be baptized by Bishop Daniel McArthur. As per custom, the chief, who was around fifty years old, was the first to be baptized as an act of respect to the chief, and to also encourage other tribe members to follow his lead.

=== Dealings with the federal government ===
In the late 1880s, a rancher named Anthony W. Ivins began efforts to convince the federal government that the Shivwits Band of Southern Paiutes should be moved to an area along the Santa Clara river. A few years later, the first Paiute reservation was established in 1891 on the Santa Clara River, west of St. George, Utah. It did not receive water rights so they were forced to abandon farming. The reservation had a population of 194 that year. There were 154 Shivwits in 1906. The Shivwits Band of Paiute Indians of Utah first received federal recognition on March 3, 1891, as the "Shebit tribe of Indians in Washington County, Utah."

Although the Shivwits Reservation was established in 1891 on the Santa Clara River, it wasn't formally recognized by the government until 1903. And although in 1916 President Woodrow Wilson issued an order to expand the reservation to 26,880 acres, the land was still too resource poor for the Shivwits to survive, so they were dependent on the federal government. In 1954, the US policy of Indian termination, which was created to encourage self-sufficiency among Native American Tribes and enforce assimilation into American society, had disastrous social and economic consequences on the Tribes. Their loss of federal recognition, and eligibility for federal support, meant that half of all tribal members died between 1954 and 1980, due to lack of basic health resources. With inadequate income to meet their needs, the Paiutes could also not afford to pay property taxes, and lost about 15,000 acres of former reservation lands. Like most Native American tribes during the termination era, the Shivwits began to suffer from diminishing pride in their cultural heritage.

Following the era of Indian assimilation, the US Department of the Interior Office of Indian Affairs approved a new constitution on March 21, 1940, to alter the governmental workings of the Shivwits Band of Paiute Indians. This constitution was limited in the actual sovereignty and powers it granted the Paiute Indians, as most tribal constitutions issued by the US government during the Indian Termination period were.

Along with other Utah Paiute tribes, the Shivwits' relationship with the federal government was terminated in the 1950s. Unlike other Paiute groups, the Shivwits retained ownership of their lands after termination and leased them to ranchers, instead of selling them outright. Currently, the Shivwits Band have over 28,000 acres in Washington County.

=== Present-day ===
The Shivwits regained federal recognition through an act signed by President Jimmy Carter on 3 April 1980. This act, Public Law 96-227, served as the Paiute Indian Tribe of Utah Restoration Act, and was enacted to restore and confirm to the members of the Bands of Shivwits, Kanosh, Koosharem, and Indian Peaks, federal services and benefits, as well as extend services to the Cedar Band.

The reservation is larger than it was originally, covering over 28,000 acres. In 2003, the Shivwits received water rights for 4,000 acre-feet (4,900,000 m^{3}) annually, enabling the tribe to create new economic development projects.

A significant concern for the Shivwits is the rapid development of the surrounding land in Washington County, and its impact on the ancient history of the Paiute nations. Many artifacts such as petroglyphs and pottery are being disturbed by home development and rapid population growth in Southern Utah.

== Government ==
The Shivwits Band is governed by a Band Council, which coordinates with federal, state, and local governments on a government-to-government basis, working to protect and advance the sovereignty of the Shivwits Band as a federally recognized Indian Tribe through transparent and effective governance and effective economic development.

The Shivwits Band is one of five Bands comprising the inter-Tribal entity of the Paiute Indian Tribe of Utah. The Paiute Indian Tribe of Utah adopted an Indian-created constitution on June 11, 1991. It passed with a vote of 31 in favor and 14 opposed, and following the approval of Ronal Eden, director of the Office of Tribal Services, was officially adopted.

As described by the constitution, the government of PITU is run by a council of six members, five of whom consist of one representative from each of the five constituent bands. These five members are chosen through popular vote in band elections, and become the respective band's council member. By default, each band has a vice-council member, chosen by getting the second highest vote.

The sixth member is the tribal-chairperson. An election is subsequently held from among those just elected to be on the council, and are elected by all the members of the tribe eligible to vote. The council member chosen to be chairman vacates their position as council member, and their vice president becomes the new council representative of their respective band. A term for council members, vice-council members, chairman, and vice-chairman is four years.

This tribal council is the main governing body of PITU, and their powers include executive and legislative powers to promulgate and enforce laws. These powers include but aren't limited to regulating laws, taxes, land and territory, so long as they don't infringe on US federal regulation, nor infringe on individual band rights which involve sovereign rights like autonomy and equality.

== Notable people ==
- Tony Tillohash (1884–1972), chairman of the Shivwits Band of Paiutes and ethnohistorian
