= Toquop Wash =

Stream in southern Nevada, US

Toquop Wash is a stream in Clark County, and Lincoln County, Nevada. Its mouth is at its confluence with the Virgin River at an elevation of 1,470 feet (450 m) in Clark County. Its source is at 37°02′25″N 114°18′49″W at an elevation of 2,920 feet (890 m), above Toquop Gap between the East Mormon Mountains and Tule Springs Hills, at the confluence of Garden Wash and Sams Camp Wash in Lincoln County.
