= Santa Clara River (Utah) =

- Native name: Tonaquint River (Ute-Southern Paiute)

Location
- Country: United States
- State: Utah
- Region: Washington County
- Cities: St. George, Santa Clara, Ivins, Pine Valley

Physical characteristics
- Source: Confluence of the Right, Middle, and Left Forks Santa Clara River
  - location: Above Pine Valley, Utah
  - coordinates: 37°22′32″N 113°27′50″W
  - elevation: 6,830 ft (2,080 m)
- Mouth: Confluence with the Virgin River
  - location: South of St. George, Utah
  - coordinates: 37°04′23″N 113°34′55″W
  - elevation: 2,536 ft (773 m)

Basin features
- River system: Right, Middle, and Left Forks Santa Clara River

The Santa Clara River is a 52-mile-long (84 km) river whose three forks join above Pine Valley in the Pine Valley Mountains in Washington County, Utah, United States. It flows west, then south, then briefly southeast before joining the Virgin River just south of downtown St. George. It is southern Utah's largest tributary to the Virgin River.

== History ==
The river was named Santa Clara by the early travelers of the Old Spanish Trail that followed the river. It was also known as the Tonaquint River, for the Tonaquint Band of Indians who lived near the river's mouth.

Archaeological evidence shows that Ancestral Puebloans (also known as the Virgin Anasazi) lived in the area from 700 B.C. to A.D. 1200 and that they had developed irrigation for their farmed crops. Their population increased until about A.D. 1200 when all Anasazi populations collapsed. They were replaced by the Southern Paiute, who also farmed along the watercourse.

The first Europeans to see the river were Fathers Escalante and Dominguez on the Domínguez–Escalante expedition. When they arrived in the upper Virgin River watershed on October 14, 1776, they encountered Southern Paiute farmers who greeted them with ears of corn. Because the land was verdant, Father Escalante called the area "Dixie." Their route here became part of the Armijo route of the Old Spanish Trail in 1829. When Armijo reached the mouth of the river as he descended the Virgin River, he named the Santa Clara River "Rio de las Milpas" (river of the cornfields). Jedediah Smith who traveled up it in 1827 called it "Corn Creek."

Early Mormon settler John D. Lee described the Southern Paiutes' farming of the land in 1852, "The Santa Clara River is 1 rod wide and 20 inches pure, clear water-rich bottoms, though narrow, and heavily timbered for the distance of 30 miles. On this stream, we saw about 100 acres of land that had been cultivated by the Pintes [sic] Indians, principally in corn and squashes; and judging from the stocks, the conclusion would be that heavy crops are and can be raised in these valleys. This tribe is numerous and has quite an area of husbandry."

== Watershed and Course ==
The river begins in the Pine Valley Mountains. The lower river includes the Santa Clara River Reserve (SCRR), which was created in 1997 by the Bureau of Land Management (BLM) and the cities of Ivins and Santa Clara. The SCRR includes 6,500 acres of public lands set aside to protect open space, and archaeological and natural sites. It is located in the west central portion of Washington County, directly southwest of the communities of Ivins and Santa Clara and east of the Shivwits Band of Paiutes Reservation. Water releases from Gunlock Reservoir maintain stream flows during the irrigation months, but releases cease during the late fall and winter months.

== Ecology ==
The Santa Clara River Reserve encompasses the entire 1,645-acre Santa Clara/Land Hill Area of Critical Environmental Concern (ACEC) which contains prehistoric Anasazi sites and preserves riparian habitat.

Along the river's banks, vegetation includes Fremont cottonwood (Populus fremontii), coyote willow (Salix exigua), seep-willow (Baccharis salicifolia), Gooddings willow (Salix gooddingii), velvet ash (Fraxinus velutina), and the exotic Russian willow and tamarisk (Tamarix ssp.). When overgrazing is prevented, native dense grasses and grass-like vegetation, including cattails and sedges, stabilize the stream banks, collect stream sediment, and slow high-velocity stream flows. Quailbush (Atriplex lentiformis), mesquite (Nahuatl mizquitl) and rabbit bush grow just outside the riparian zone. Critical habitat for threatened and endangered plant species including the dwarf bear claw poppy (Arctomecon humilis) and the Holmgren's milkvetch (Astragalus holmgreniorum) are also found in the SCRR.

Colonists noted there were many beaver (Castor canadensis) dams along the Santa Clara River and that these areas were farmed by Southern Paiutes who relied at least partly on the beavers for dam building and maintenance of the water table. As Santa Clara was colonized, the colonists killed the beavers, and with the loss of beaver dams to recharge the water table, the land became increasingly arid. Observing this, Juanita Brooks wrote, "at the time the wife of Thales Haskell was shot by a young Indian man, Haskell was away up the creek taking out beaver dams". In addition, loss of the beaver dams after colonists' arrival in the area left storm surges unchecked and probably contributed to several severe floods that eroded away much of the rich alluvial lands. The historical eyewitness observation of Thomas D. Brown summarizes how aboriginal Paiute farming was interdependent with the beaver dams, "There appears many patches of good wheat land on this stream, across which Beaver dams are built every few rods, & the banks being low, the water overflows much & renders the bottoms good grazing patches".

== See also ==
- List of rivers of Utah
