= Hidden Springs, Arizona =

Populated place in Coconino County, Arizona

Hidden Springs Mission, Arizona
- Populated place
- Location within the state of Arizona Hidden Springs Mission (the United States)
- Coordinates: 36°11′21″N 111°23′42″W
- Country: United States
- State: Arizona
- County: Coconino
- Elevation: 4,820 ft (1,469 m)
- Time zone: UTC-7 (Mountain (MST))
  - Summer (DST): UTC-7 (MST)
- Area code: 928
- FIPS code: 04-32735
- GNIS feature ID: 25251

Hidden Springs is a populated place situated in Coconino County, Arizona, United States, located on U.S. 89 approximately 75 miles north of Flagstaff. It has an estimated elevation of 4,819 feet (1,469 m) above sea level. The San Juan Southern Paiute Tribe of Arizona is located there.

Prior to 1963, the location was state-owned highway camp. In 1963, the state leased the land and a church, Hidden Springs Mission was constructed. When the tribe was created in the early 1990s, it considered locating its headquarters there.
