= Southern Paiute people =

Indigenous people native to the US states of Nevada, Arizona, and Utah

Southern Paiute
Nuwuvi
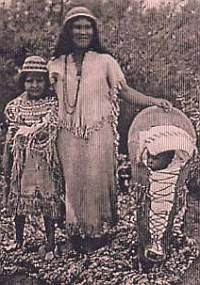
- Moapa woman and girl in traditional Paiute basket hats near Las Vegas, circa 1900. Baby swaddled in rabbit robes in cradleboard.

Regions with significant populations
- United States (Arizona, Nevada, Utah, California)

Languages
- Colorado River Numic (ISO 639-3, ute), English

Religion
- Southern Paiute religion, Christianity

Related ethnic groups
- Ute, Chemehuevi, Kawaiisu

The Southern Paiute people (/ˈpaɪjuːt/) are a tribe of Native Americans who have lived in the Colorado River basin of southern Nevada, northern Arizona, and southern Utah. Bands of Southern Paiute live in scattered locations throughout this territory and have been granted federal recognition on several reservations. Southern Paiutes traditionally spoke Colorado River Numic, which is now a critically endangered language of the Numic branch of the Uto-Aztecan language family, and is mutually intelligible with Ute. The term Paiute comes from paa (meaning water in Ute /ˈjuːt/) and refers to their preference for living near water sources. They practiced springtime, floodplain farming with reservoirs and irrigation ditches for corn, squash, melons, gourds, sunflowers, beans, and wheat.

The first European contact with the Southern Paiute occurred in 1776, when fathers Silvestre Vélez de Escalante and Francisco Atanasio Domínguez encountered them during an attempt to find an overland route to the missions of California. They noted that some of the Southern Paiute men "had thick beards and were thought to look more in appearance like Spanish men than native Americans".

In 1851, Mormon settlers strategically occupied Paiute land and water sources, although the relationship between each groups was peaceful at first. The Paiutes even served as an intermediary between the neighboring Navajo and Ute tribes and the Mormon settlers. The Mormon missionary Jacob Hamblin worked at diplomatic efforts. The introduction of European settlers and agricultural practices (most especially large herds of cattle) made it difficult for the Southern Paiute to continue their traditional lifestyle, as the livestock ate seeds that were part of their diet, drove away the game, which reduced their ability to hunt, as well as to gather natural foods.

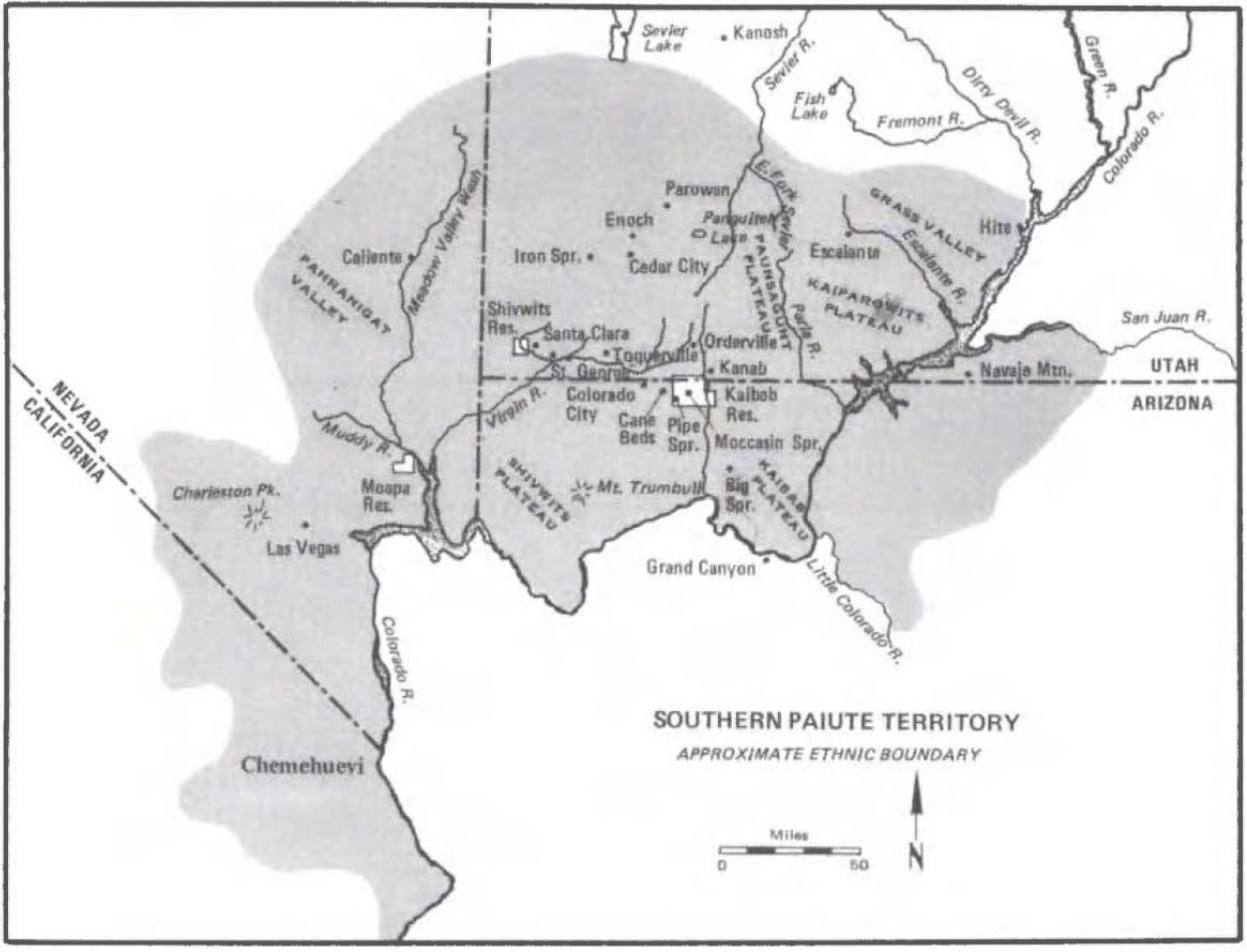
Ancestral lands of Southern Paiute groups overlaid on a map of the Colorado River and current US state boundaries.

Today, Southern Paiute communities are located at Las Vegas, Pahrump, and Moapa, in Nevada; Cedar City, Kanosh, Koosharem, Shivwits, and Indian Peaks, in Utah; at Kaibab and Willow Springs, in Arizona.

== Public relations ==
=== Early policy ===
Prior to the 1850s, the Paiute people lived relatively peacefully with the other Native American groups. These groups included the Navajo, Ute, and Hopi peoples. Though there was the occasional tension and violent outbreaks between groups, the Paiute were mainly able to live in peace with other tribes and settlers due to their loose social structure. Most Paiute lived in small familial groups, and only gathered together in large settings for matters of trade and commerce. Prior to the 1850s, their biggest antagonists were raiders from competing peoples such as the Navajo, Ute, and Hopi. The Navajos were particularly known for intruding on Paiute grazing land and engaging in raids to capture Paiute women and children for the slave trade.

Prior to the 1860s, there had been no long-term development of the land. Most of the non-native contact they had was with transient militants or traders. Paiute fought hard to defend their ancestral lands, and at first were successful in driving the settlers out. During the second half of the 1800s, the most prominent groups to migrate to Paiute lands were Mormon pioneers from the Church of Jesus Christ of Latter Day Saints (LDS Church) and silver miners in Pioche, Nevada. LDS militiamen convinced some members of the Coal Creek and Ash Creek bands of Southern Paiute individuals in southwestern Utah territory to assist them in the Mountain Meadows Massacre in exchange for cattle in order to blame Native Americans for the attack. In 1869, a rich investor named François Louis Alfred Pioche invested in a silver mine in the town of Pioche, which initially depended upon cheap Paiute labor to work in the mines. The conditions in the mines caused a dramatic decline in the Paiute population. Paiute children were mandated to attend American schools, which attempted to assimilate them as much as possible. By the early 1900s, there were approximately 800 Paiute people.

=== Modern relations ===
In the 1950s, the Indian termination policies of the federal government stripped the Paiute who lived in Utah of their health and educational benefits, federal tax protection, and agricultural assistance. This left them on their own in a weak and unstable state. The first attempt of reconciliation was made in 1980, with the Restoration Act, which recognized the Paiute in Utah as a tribe. It united the five main bands who lived in Utah into one tribe: the Cedars, Indian Peaks, Kanosh, Koosharem, and Shivwits. The bill also restored the bands to a system of federal aid and support. Although the Southern Paiute in Nevada and Arizona did not lose their legal status as recognized tribes during this period, they also experienced some of the same discrimination during the termination era.

== Culture ==
=== Basket weaving ===
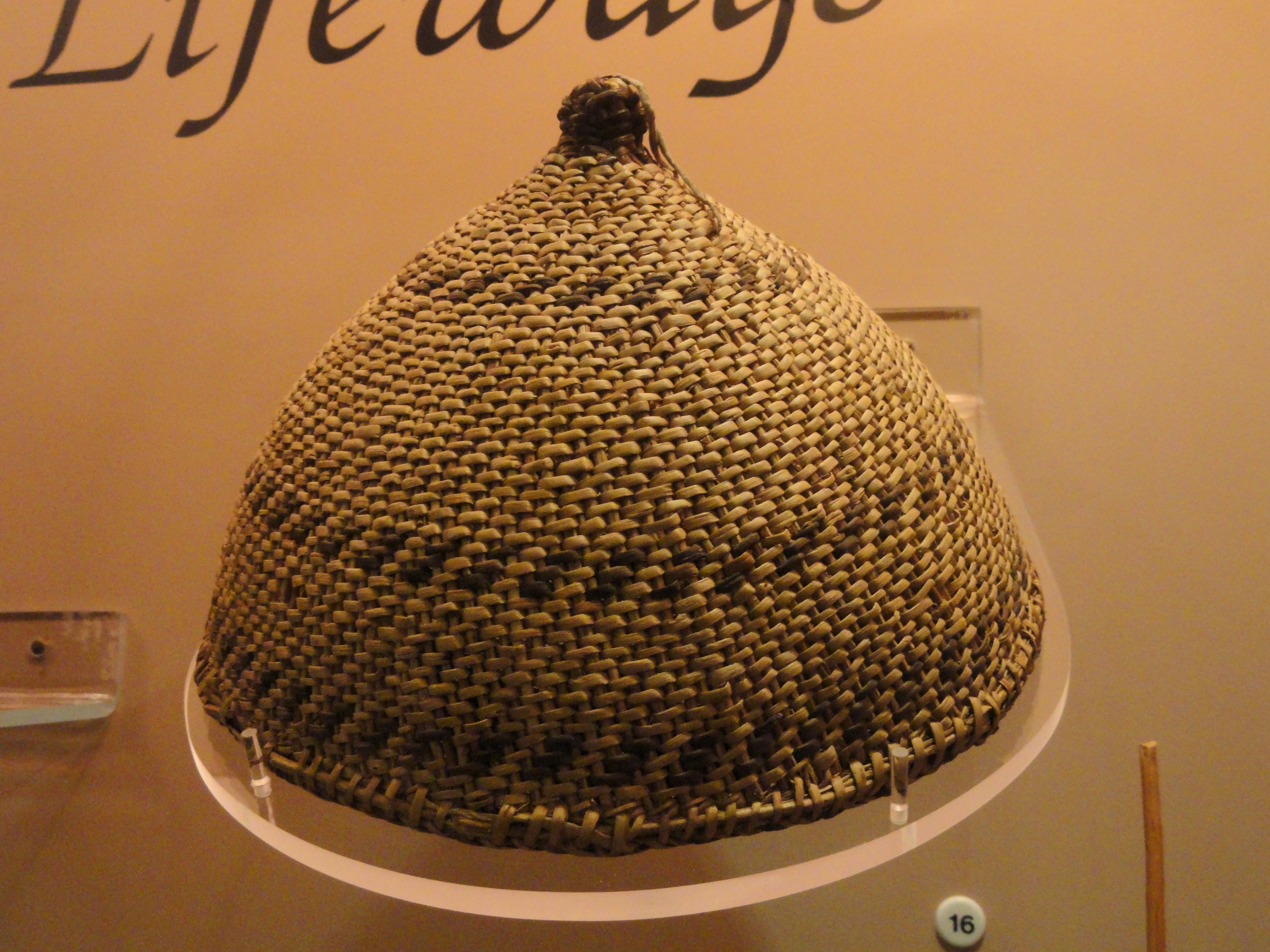
Southern Paiute woven hat from 1876 at a Harvard University museum.

One of the most important skills the women of the Paiute tribes had was their basket weaving skills. They would often use red-stemmed willows to weave their baskets. These skills were used in almost every aspect of their lives, and the skill is believed to have been passed down from mother to daughter for at least 9,000 years. When they would go to gather and forage they would carry large conical baskets on their back to collect things.

Specific tools were created including ones to strip fruit off of bushes and trees, ones used for winnowing, and ones used to get to roots better. They would also tightly weave these big baskets with clay and resin to create cooking pots and water jugs. Oftentimes, smaller tools were left behind, whereas bigger products such as cooking pots went with the families as they moved around. Based on the region the families were located determined different uses for the weaving. For instance, those who lived by marshes learned to create duck decoys, nets, and rafts to better hunt the water fowl. Another use for this skill was to create their houses. They would use long thin grasses to tightly weave stalks of Cattails together, and in doing so they created these long board-like sections of grasses that they would set up around long willow limbs stuck in the ground.

=== Traditional diet ===
A staple food for the Southern Paiute was the bitterroot. They also depended on wild carrot, wild onion, and chokecherries. Chokecherries were useful in more ways than one - their stems were brewed to make a sweet drink, and their berries would be crushed, then dried to be saved for later. When aphids came and swarmed the cane plants, they would leave small drops of nectar where they punctured the cane stalk. Knowing this the Southern Paiute women would take the cane rods and beat them until the small dried droplets came loose. These droplets were then tossed in a winnowing dish to be separated from the remnants of the cane. Often these small particles were the main income of sweetness for the people. Another seed they would gather are waada seeds, minuscule black seeds that would be ground up into meal. Those who lived in a region with an adequate water supply would set up farms, complete with ditch irrigation. The biggest crops were maize, squash, and wheat. The men were the primary hunters, they would hunt waterfowl, rabbits, bighorn sheep, and other mammals in the regions they passed through.

=== Paiute archery ===
==== Bows ====
There is a bow collected by the Smithsonian Institution in 1872. Made from a hardwood branch, possibly Mesquite or mountain mahogany, and is 38 5/8 inches from tip to tip. The bow is round in cross section, and the string is two ply sinew. It has a sinew back, and the sinew has been stained with a reddish brown ocher. The bow is utilitarian and still has carving marks, as to be expected of a practical weapon in a hostile and harsh desert environment.

==== Arrows ====
A set of Paiute arrows was acquired by the Smithsonian Institution in 1874. Only one arrow has a point. The arrowhead is attached by pine pitch glue. There are sinew wrappings behind the point, but they are to prevent the shaft from splitting when the target is hit. The feathers are hawk and buzzard.

==== Quivers and bowcases ====
A Paiute arrow quiver was acquired by the Smithsonian Institution in 1872. The quiver is made of deerskin with thick hair still on the case, showing the deer was killed in the winter, and is sewn with two ply sinew, much like the bowstring. "The quiver is plain, with no decoration, as would be expected of a desert dwelling culture."

=== Holy land traditions ===
The Southern Paiute people believe in Puaxant Tuvip, or power land. It is their holy land that links to many significant landmarks in Southern Paiute memory and stories. For instance Nuvagantu, or Mount Charleston in Nevada is a holy landmark that the Southern Paiute people believe was where they were created. These holy lands were places that the separate families or tribes would come to barter, trade, socialize and perform religious ceremonies. Another large landmark that is culturally significant to the Southern Paiute is the Colorado river and the Grand Canyon. The modern-day importance of these holy lands is that the Southern Paiute claim the supernaturally given right to know what happens and the impacts of any projects that occur in their holy lands.

== Organization of the Southern Paiute people ==
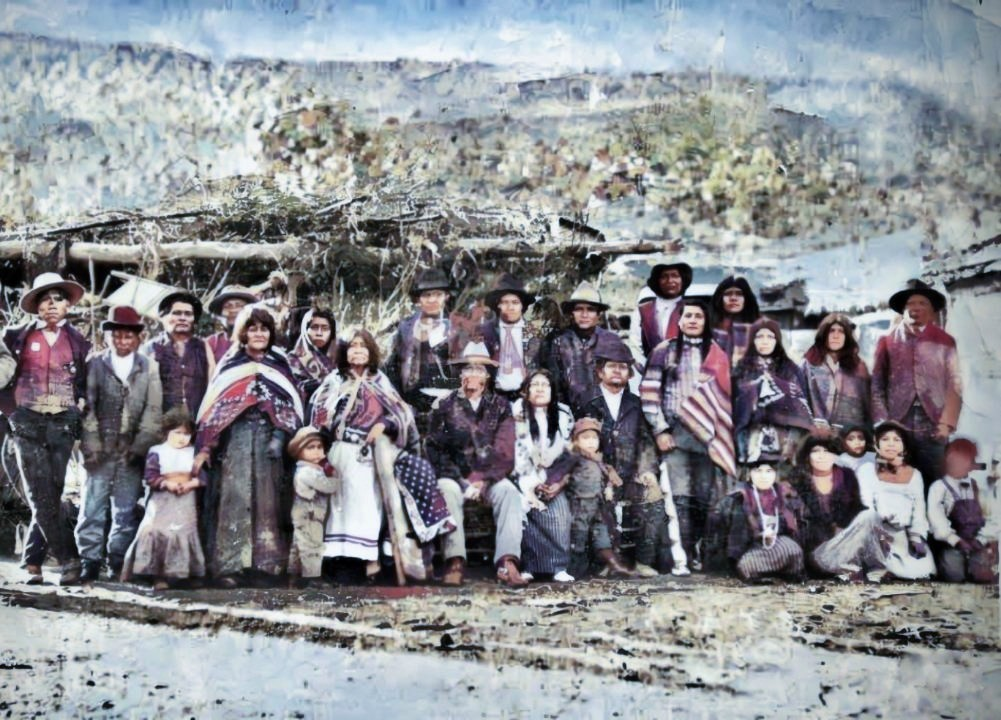
Koosharem Southern Paiute people in Koosharem, Utah 1905.

One important aspect of gathering food was the social aspect, often families would come together for foraging and games and then depart and go their different ways. The Southern Paiute were not organized tribally. Groups were instead made up of small family units that would occasionally come together with others to socialize. Each group was about 10-50 related people. Family ties were very important to these groups and determined group movements and interdependence among groups. Marriages were thus very important to the Southern Paiute.

The leader of the group was called a Headman, and he would be old enough to know a lot about the land, but young enough to still participate in the tribes activities, and he usually had several different family ties within the group. His job was to wake early in the morning, and using his knowledge he would make specific suggestions of what he thought the tribe should do that day, and if people thought his observations were astute they would follow him, if not then they would not. His suggestions would be based on the weather, season, and abundance of food. If over time they stopped following his ideas and instead turned to another, then the Headman leader title would move onto that person. The Headman also was supposed to settle any disputes that came up. Oftentimes, different sub-units of the Southern Paiute would be classified by the settlers coming in from Europe based on what they ate. So you had those who ate waada seeds, those who ate trout, those who ate cattails, etc. While the Southern Paiute people are categorized as one group, there were subgroups within the whole that were differentiated based on location and dialect.

=== Traditional Southern Paiute bands ===
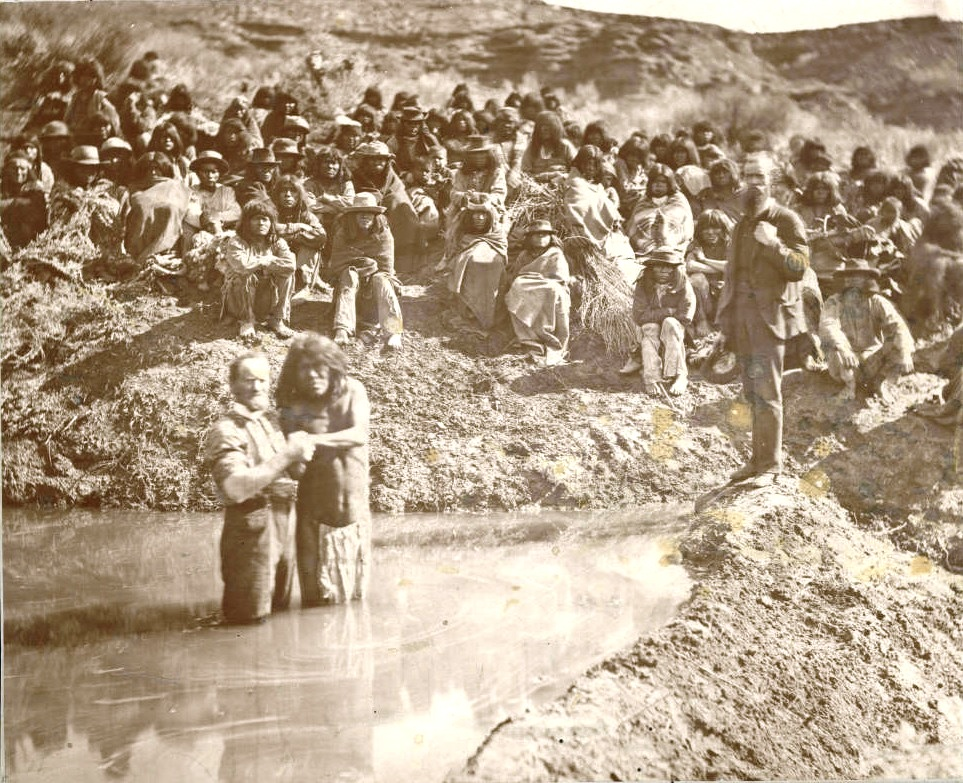

Shivwits Southern Paiute in 1875.

The Southern Paiute traditionally had 16 to 31 subgroups, bands, or tribes, including the following:

- Ankakkani'kacimi (Un-ka-ka'-ni-guts, Unka-kanig-its, Oaw'tuhus'eng):

"Yellow Mouth of Canyon People" in present Long Valley

- Antarianunts (Ute name with ending unts, Paiute name Yantarɨi):

Mixed Southern Paiute-Ute band from Escalante River east to Colorado River and southeast to Henry Mountains, Utah

- Beaver band (Kʷi?umpacíɨi, Kwiumpus, Quiumputs)):

"Frasera speciosa people", lived in Beaver Valley along Beaver River near today's Beaver, Utah, some intermarried with the Pahvant Ute band to the north living in the deserts near Sevier Lake

- Cedar band (Ankappanukkicɨcimɨ, Unkapanukuints):

"Red-stream people", or Suh’dutsing, "Cedar people" from near Cedar City, Utah

- Chemehuevi /tʃɛmɪˈweɪvi/ (Nüwüwü, Tantáwats):

Branch of Southern Paiute, southernmost of the groups.

- Gunlock band (Matooshats, Matissatï):

Name given them by their southern neighbors, the St. George band/Uainuints, Gunlocks instead bestowed the term to some Southern Paiute bands northeast of them. Lived near Gunlock in southwest Utah

- Kaibab (Kai'vi'vits, Kaipapicɨcimɨ, Kaivavwits, Kaibabits, Kaipa'pici, Kaivavituvingui):

"Mountain Lying Down People" the Kaibab Plateau and Kaibab National Forest in northern Arizona are named after them

- Indian Peak Band (Kwee’choovunt):

"Peak People"

- Kaiparowits:

"Mountain home of the people", lived along the Escalante River and were hunting the Kaiparowits Plateau in Utah, therefore also known as Escalante band

- Las Vegas band (Nɨpakantɨcimɨ, Nuvagantucimi):

"People of Charleston Peak"

- Moapa (Muapaa, Moapats):

"Muddy Creek Paiute"

- Pahranagat (Pata?nikicɨ):

"Person who sticks his feet in the water", named for the Pahranagat Valley, Nevada

- Panaca (Tsouwaraits, Matisabits):

Named for Panaca, Nevada

- Panguitch (Pakiucimi):

"Fish people", named for Panguitch, Utah

- San Juan band (Kwaiantikowkets):

"People being over on the opposite side", from the San Juan River in northern Arizona

- Shivwits (Sipicimi, Shebits, Sübüts):

"People who live in the East" or See’veetseng, "Whitish Earth People"

- Uinkaret (Yipinkatɨtɨcimɨ):

"People of Mount Trumbull"

- Uainuints (Uenuwunts, Tonaquints):

Hunted and farmed from Hebron (Shoal Creek Fort), Enterprise and Pinto southward along the Santa Clara River (also called Tonaquint River) to his mouth into the Virgin River south of today's Saint George, Utah, therefore called St. George Band)

=== Contemporary Southern Paiute federally recognized tribes ===
- Kaibab Band of Paiute Indians of the Kaibab Indian Reservation, Arizona—Kaibab Indian Reservation, Kaibab, Arizona
- Las Vegas Tribe of Paiute Indians of the Las Vegas Indian Colony—Las Vegas, Nevada
- Moapa Band of Paiute Indians of the Moapa River Indian Reservation—Moapa River Indian Reservation, Moapa, Nevada
- Paiute Indian Tribe of Utah—Cedar City, Utah
  - Cedar City Band of Paiutes
  - Kanosh Band of Paiutes
  - Koosharem Band of Paiutes
  - Indian Peaks Band of Paiutes
  - Shivwits Band of Paiutes
- San Juan Southern Paiute Tribe of Arizona—Navajo Nation, Tuba City, Arizona
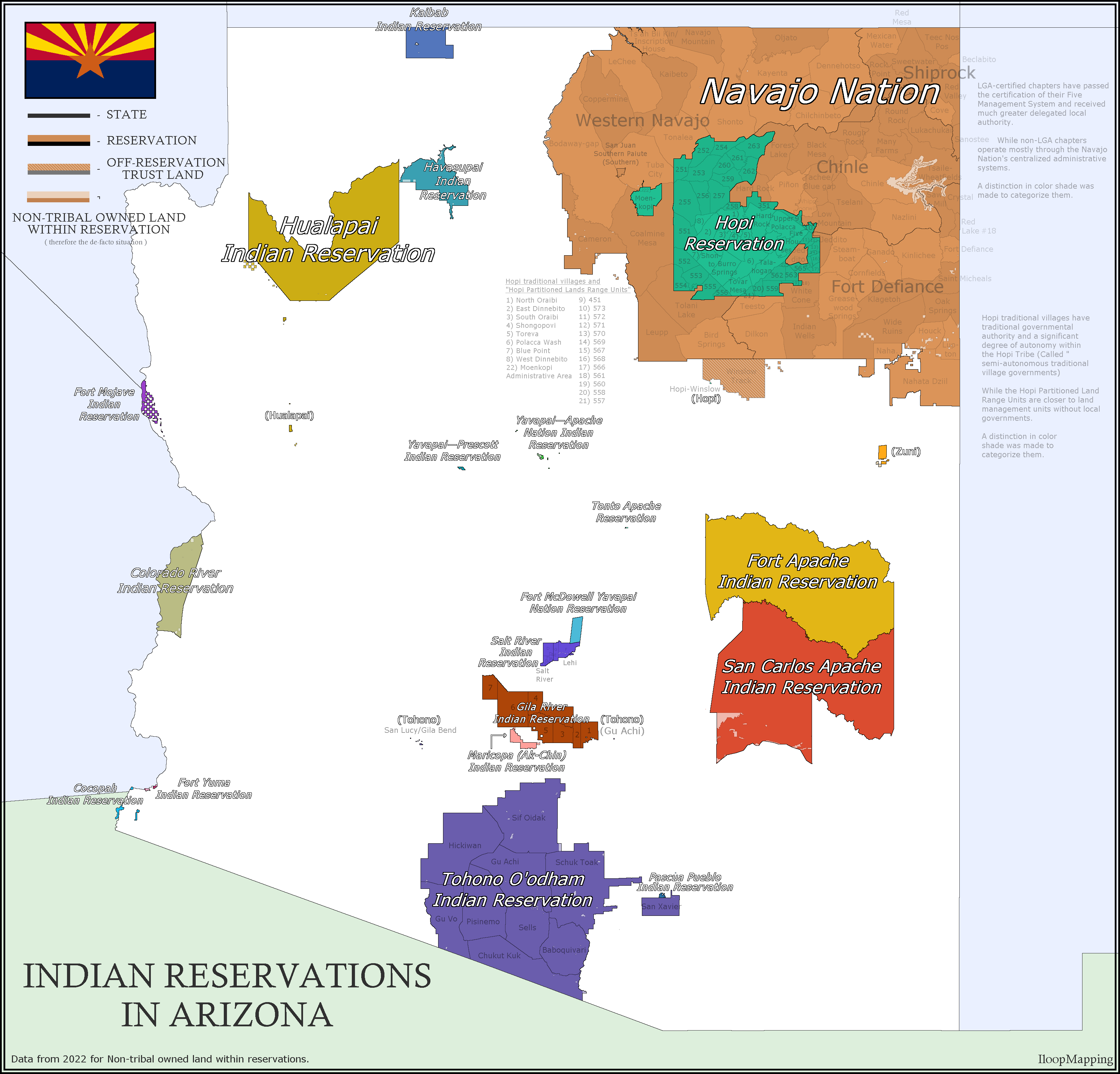
Map of Southern Paiute Reservations in Arizona and neighboring reservations (Navajo, Kaibab).

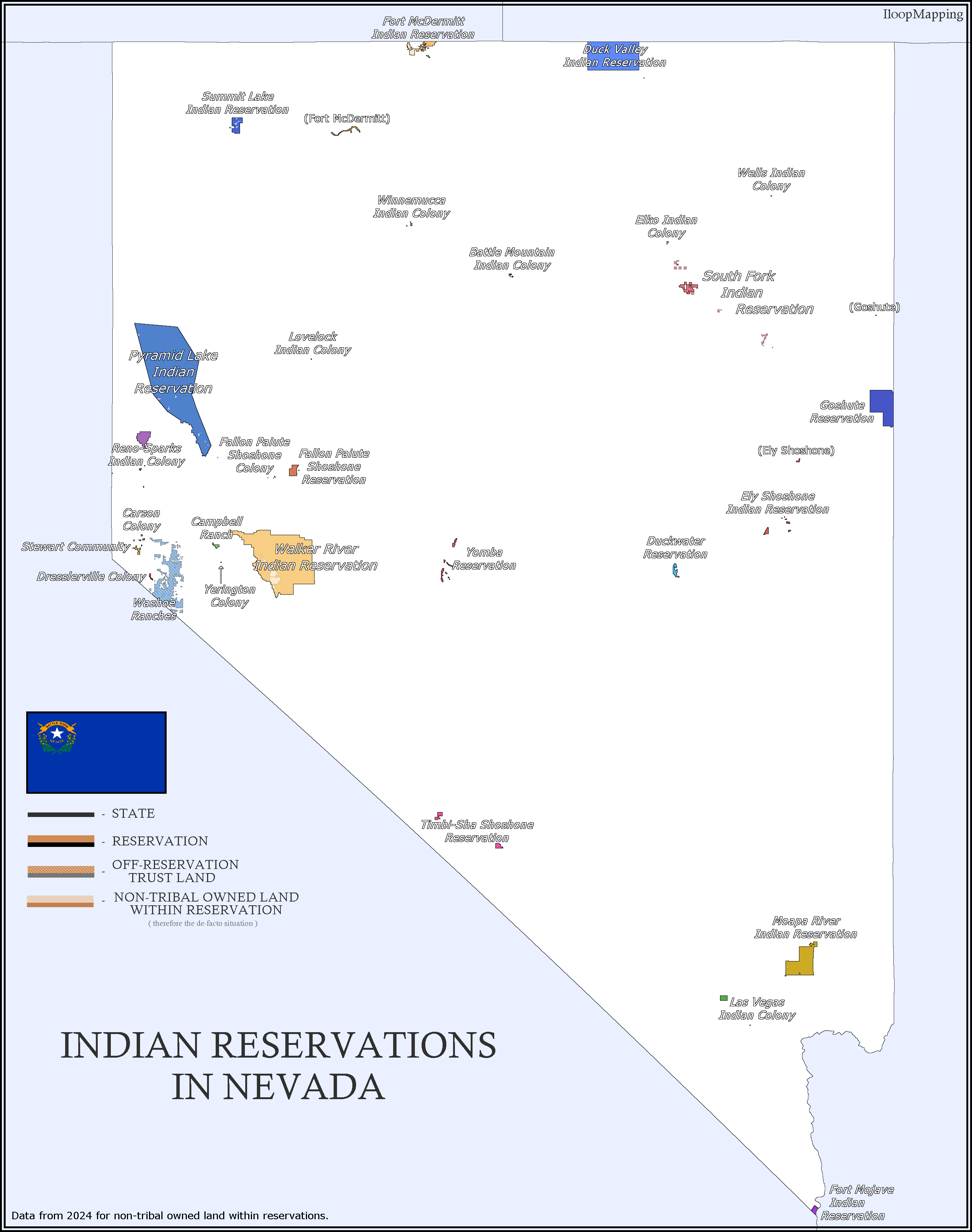
Map of Southern Paiute Reservations in Nevada and neighboring reservations (Las Vegas, Moapa River).

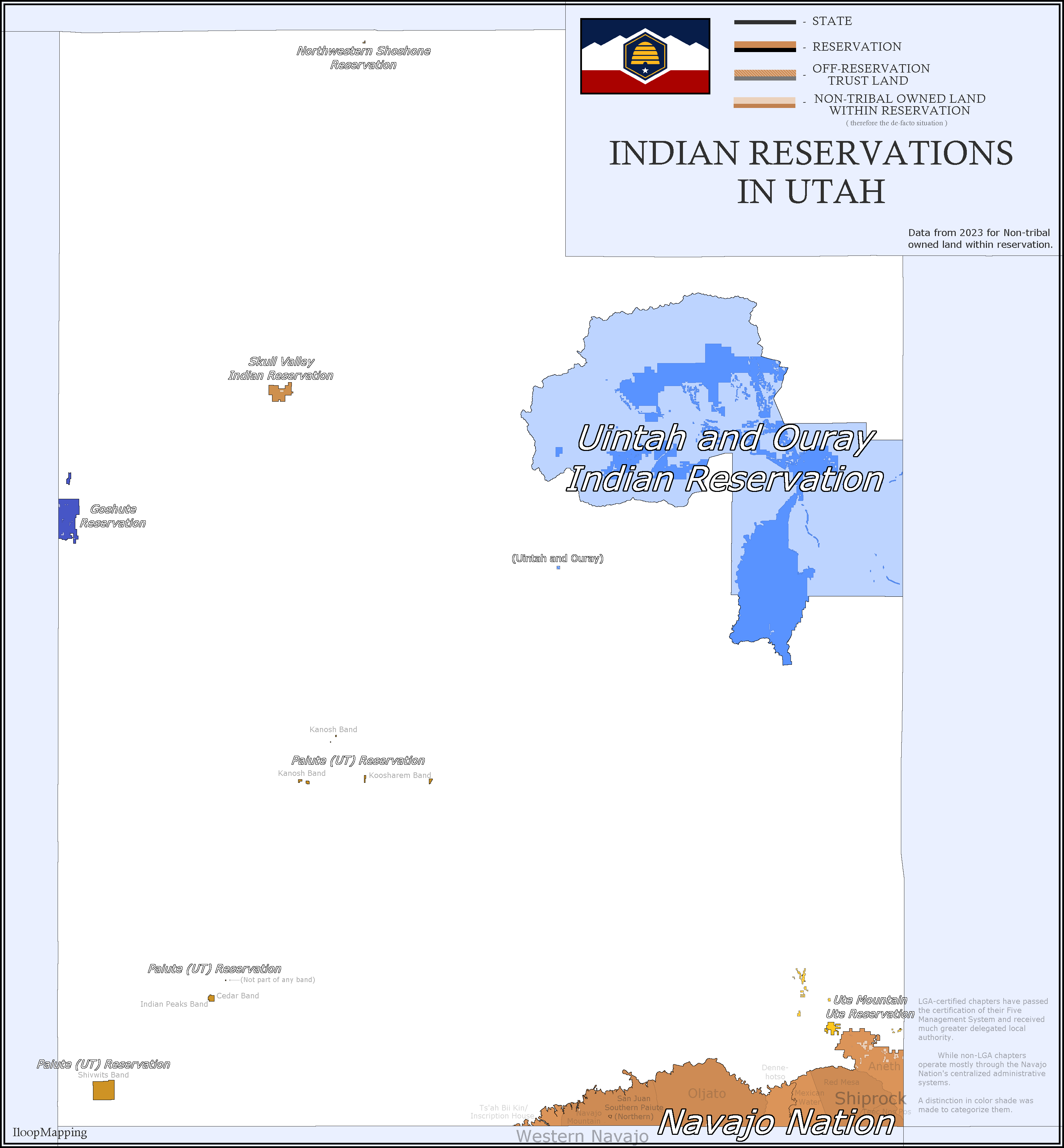
Map of Southern Paiute Reservations in Utah and neighboring reservations (Paiute (UT)).

== Notable Southern Paiute ==
- Tau-gu (1845?–1895?): Leader in the 1870s
- Tony Tillohash (1886–1972): Linguist and politician

== Gallery of traditional dress, hairstyles, buildings, and basket making ==
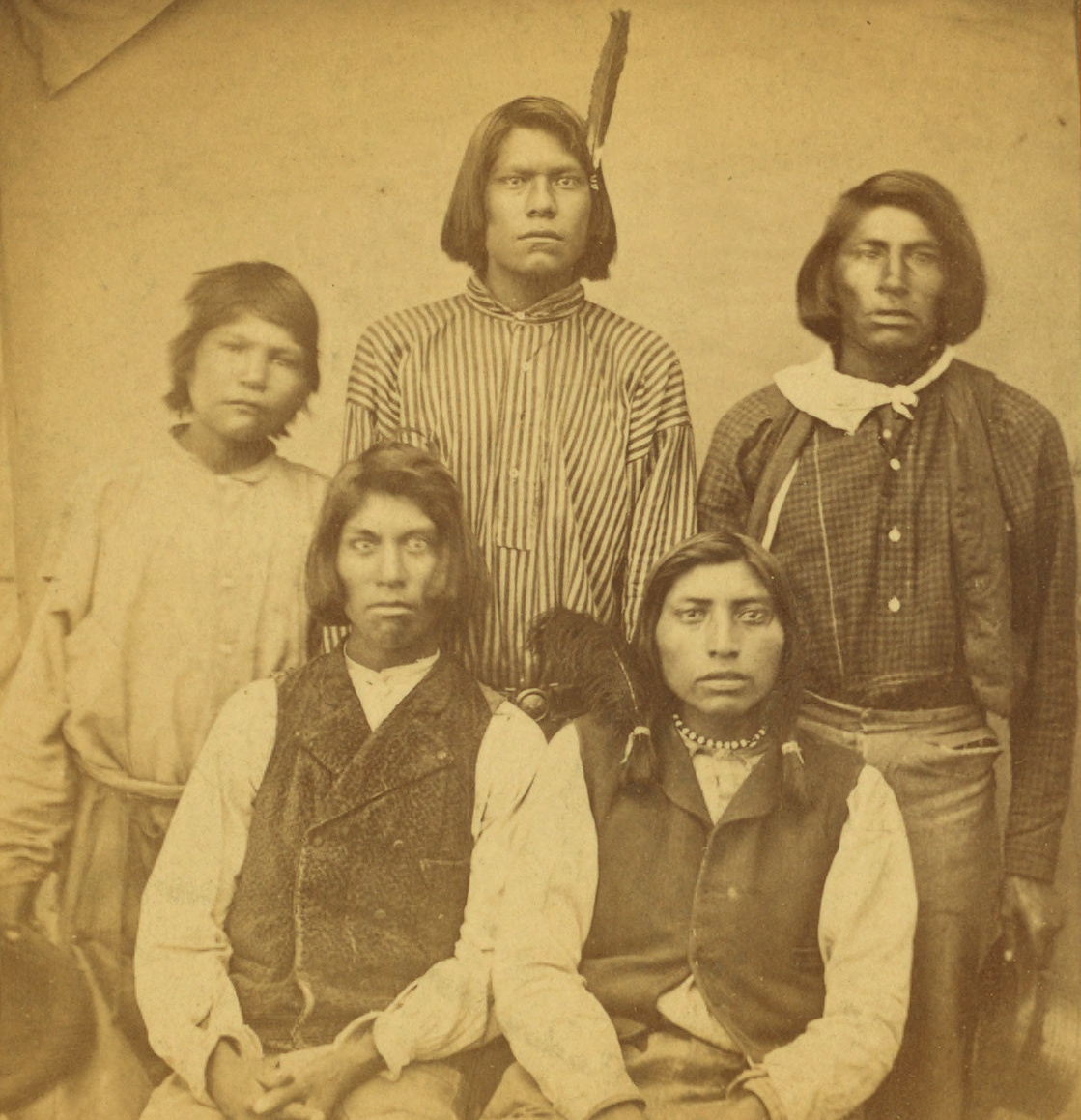
Young men in Reno, Nevada, circa 1870

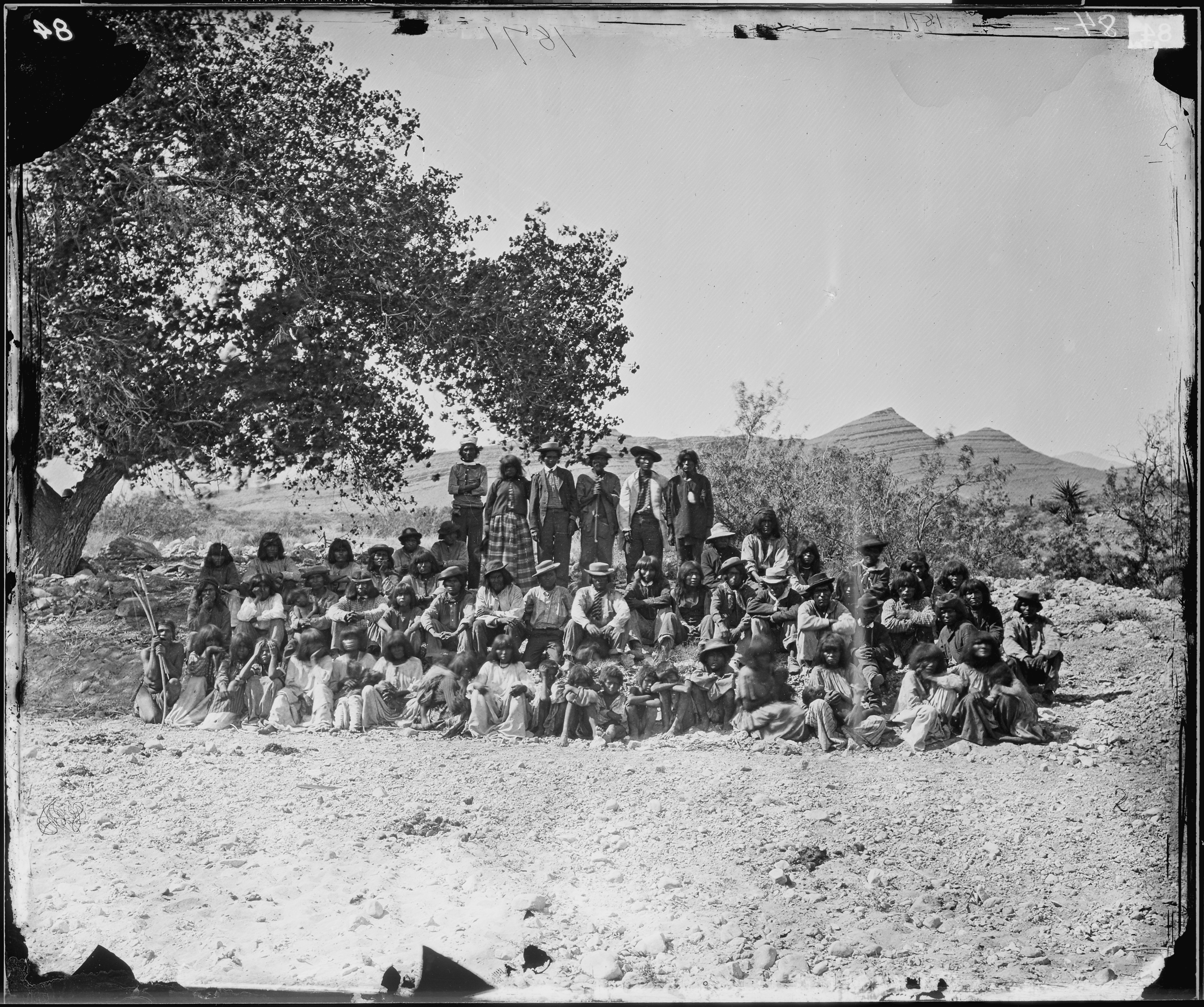
Paiute group Cottonwood Spring, Nevada, 1871

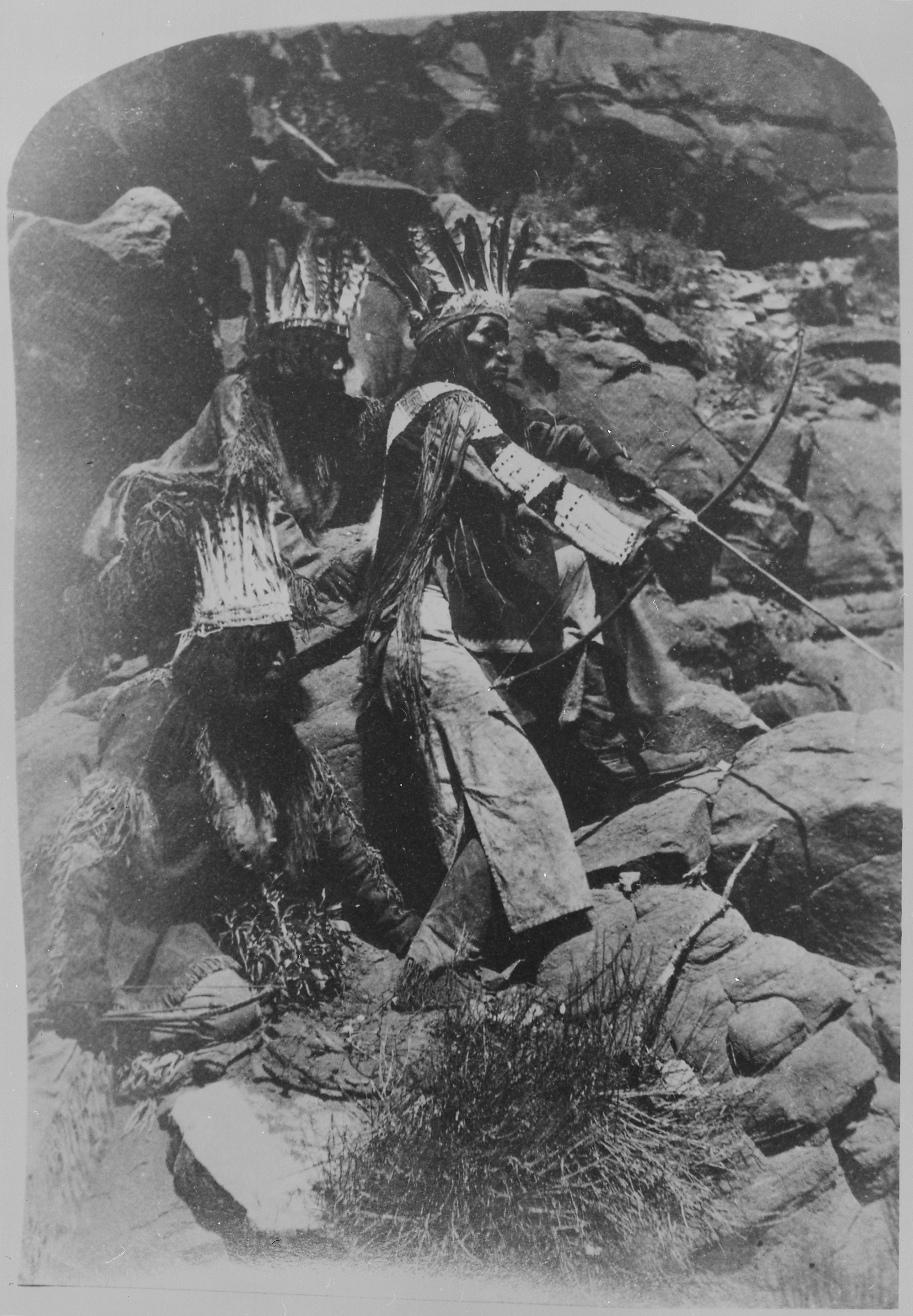
Traditional dress and hunting bow, 1872

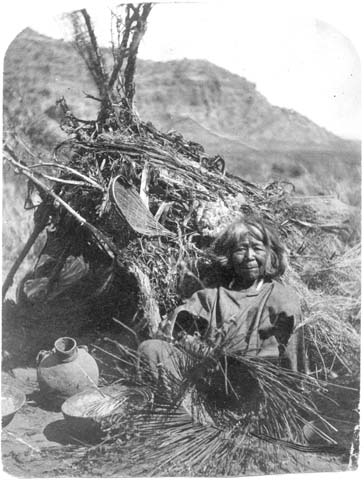
Basket weaver photographed circa 1873

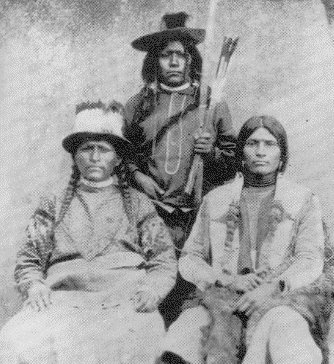
Paiute near Mountain Meadows, southwestern Utah, 1880

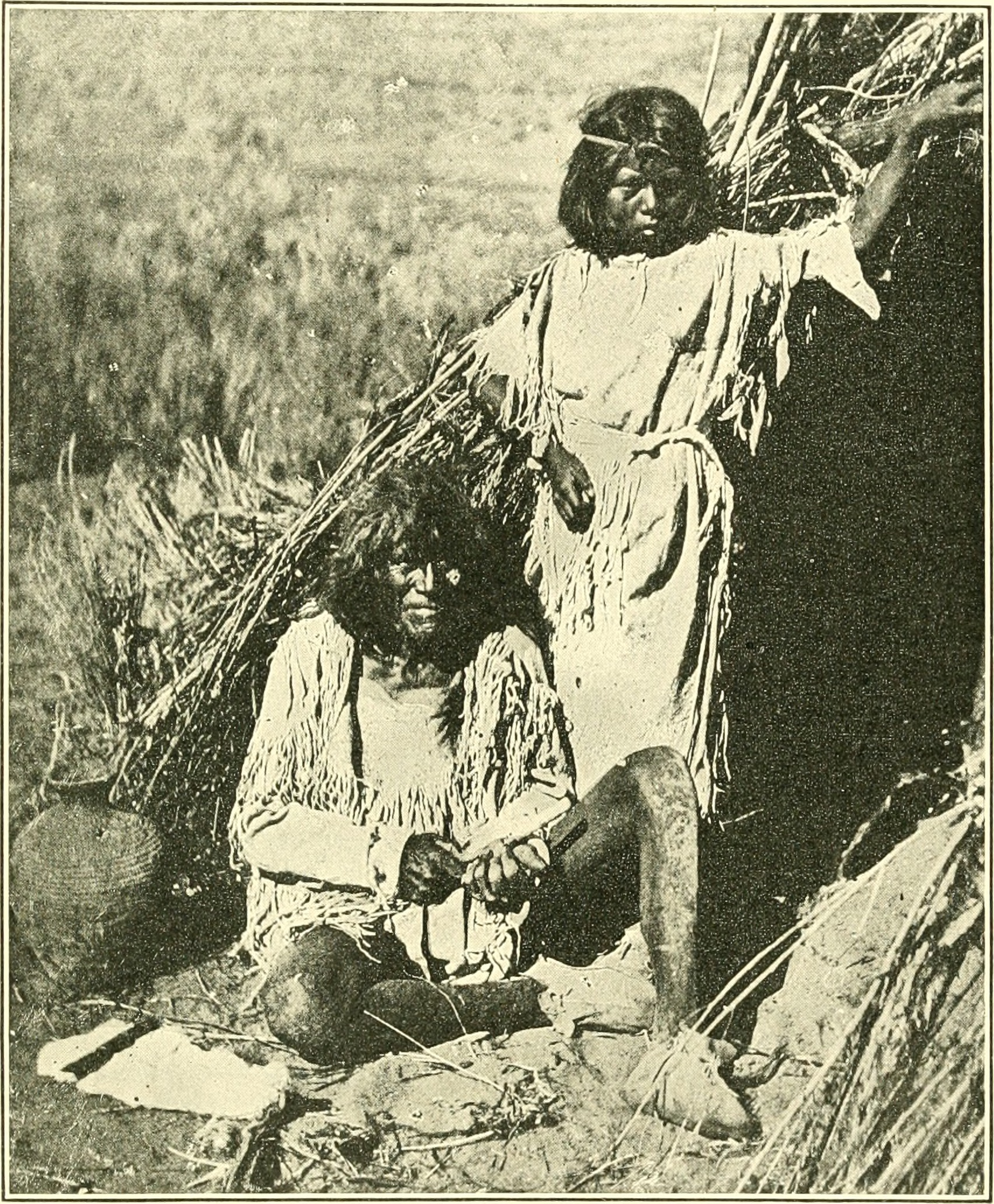
Chipping a stone knife, 1901

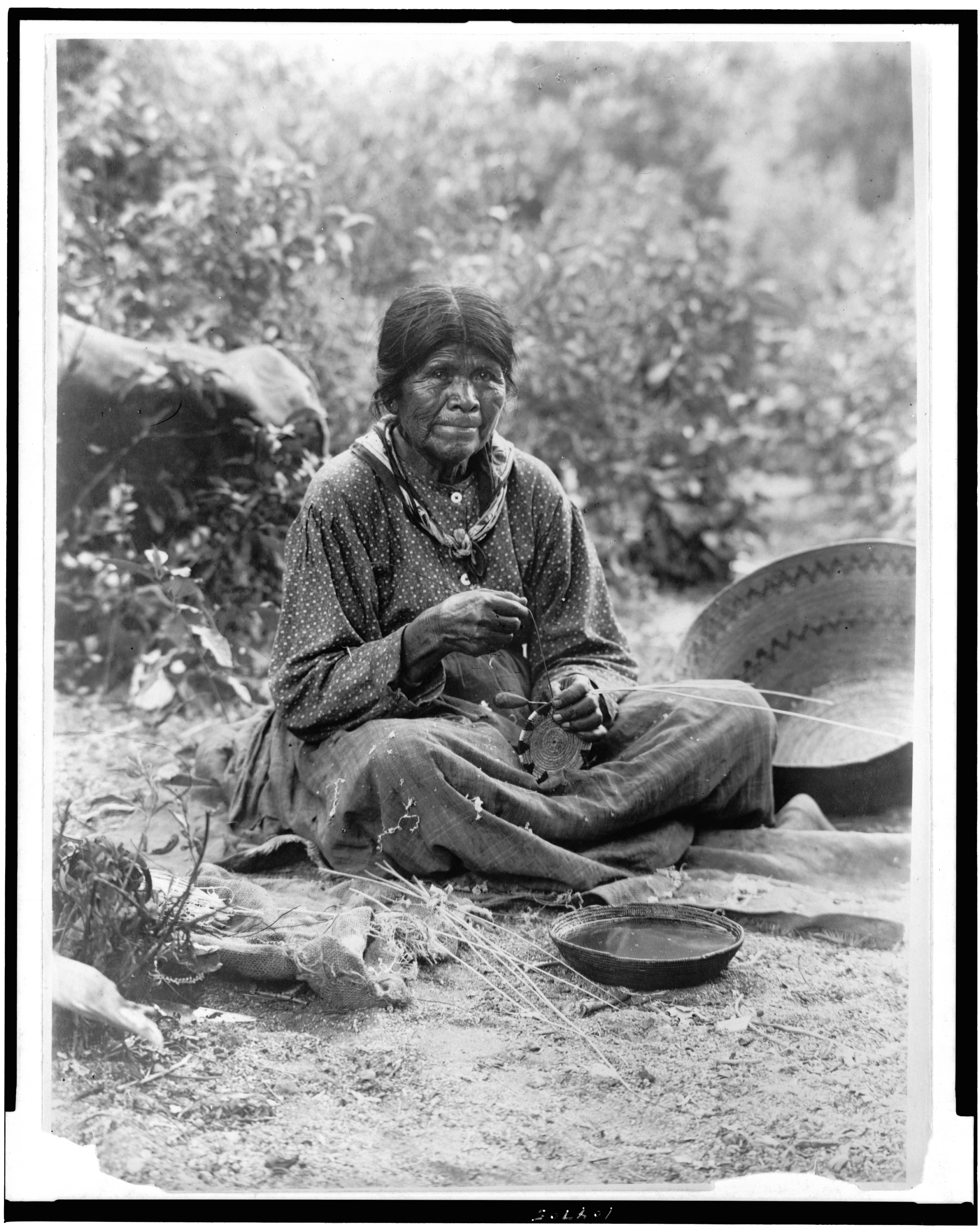
Basket maker, 1902

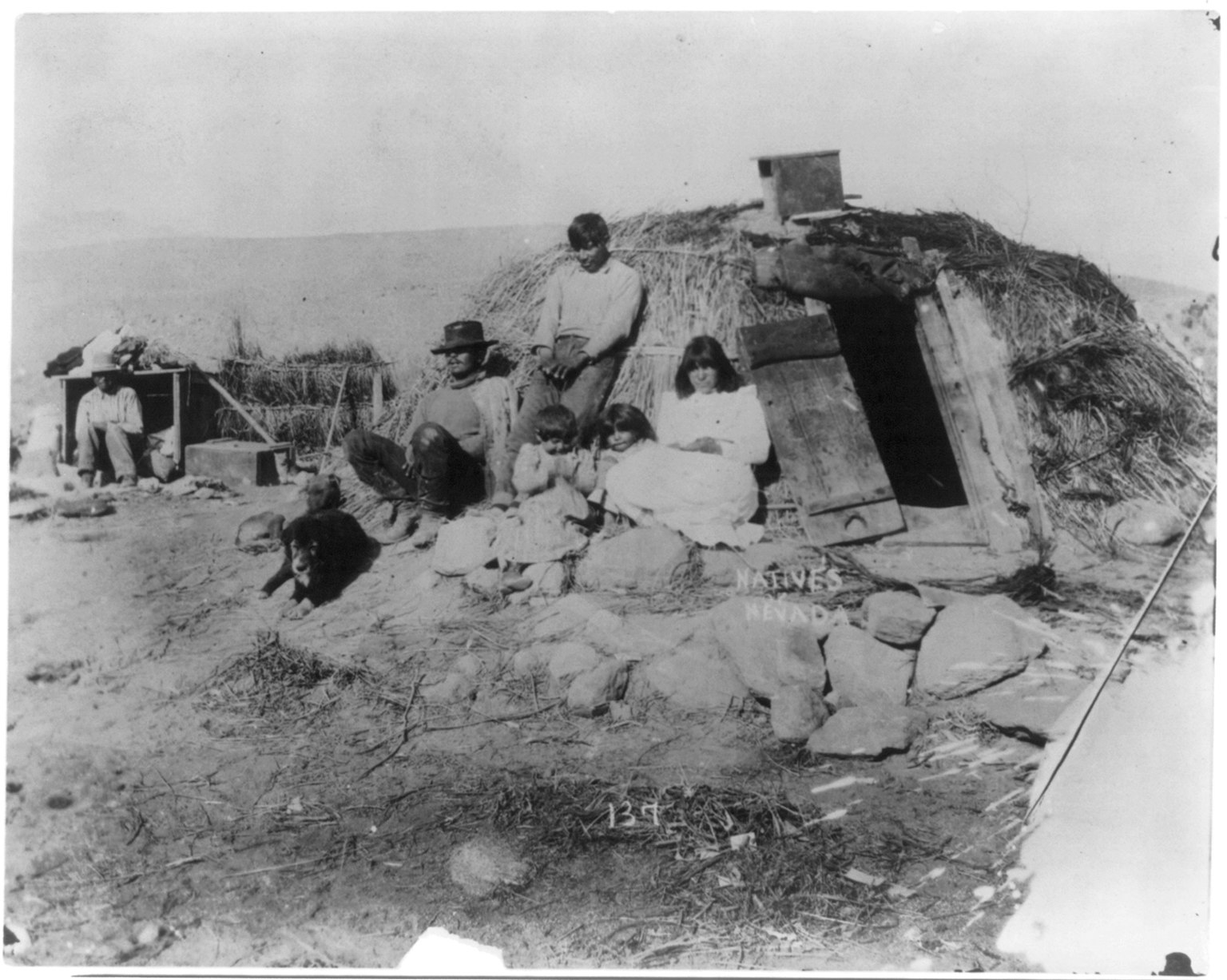
Homes, circa 1906

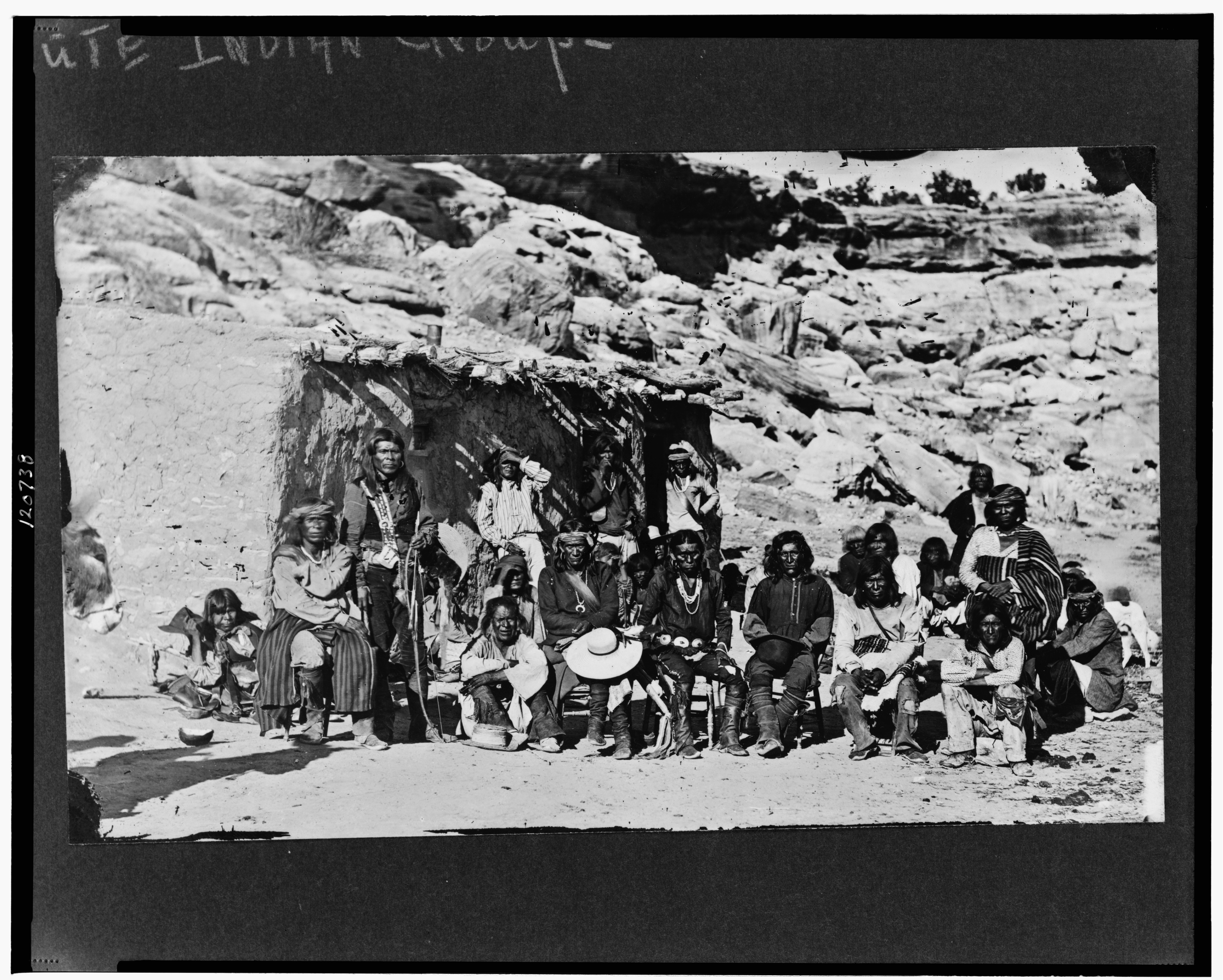
Adobe house, 1909
