= White Mesa, Utah =

- CDP
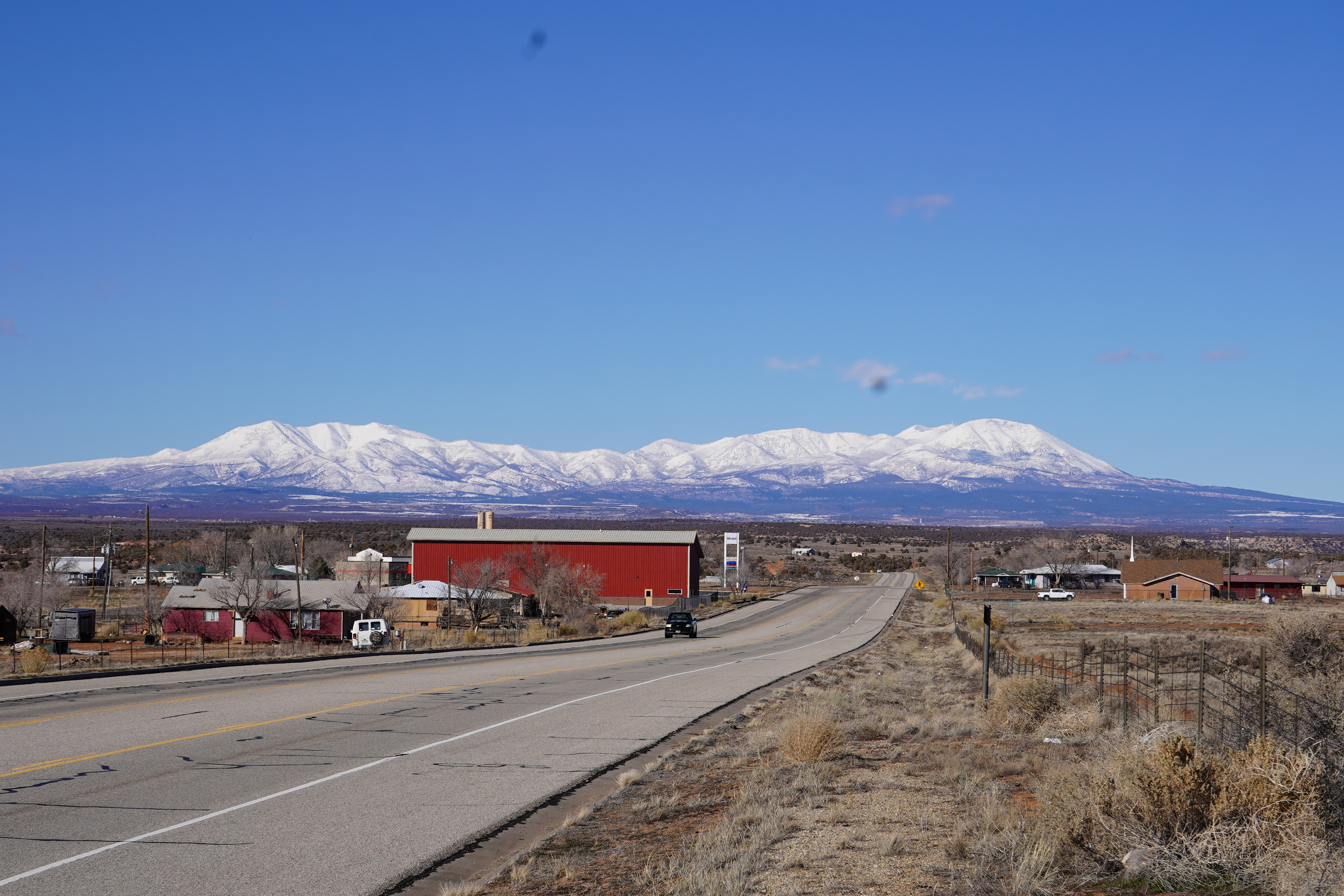

- Location in San Juan County and the state of Utah.
- Coordinates: 37°28′06″N 109°28′16″W
- Country: United States
- State: Utah
- County: San Juan

Area
  - Total: 15.5 sq mi (40.1 km^{2})
  - Land: 15.5 sq mi (40.1 km^{2})
  - Water: 0 sq mi (0.0 km^{2})
- Elevation: 5,276 ft (1,608 m)

Population (2020)
  - Total: 178
  - Density: 11.5/sq mi (4.44/km^{2})
- Time zone: UTC-7 (Mountain (MST))
  - Summer (DST): UTC-6 (MDT)
- ZIP code: 84511
- Area code: 435
- FIPS code: 49-84095
- GNIS feature ID: 2409583

White Mesa is a census-designated place (CDP) in San Juan County, Utah, United States. The population was 178 at the 2020 census. It is located within a section of the Ute Mountain Ute Tribe reservation along U.S. Route 191, south of Blanding and north of Bluff.

== Geography ==
White Mesa is located at 37°28′06″N 109°28′03″W.

According to the United States Census Bureau, the CDP has a total area of 15.5 square miles (40.1 km^{2}), all land.

== Demographics ==
Languages (2000)	Percent
Spoke Colorado River Numic at home	50.59%
Spoke English at home	43.48%
Spoke Navajo at home	5.93%

As of the census of 2000, there were 277 people, 79 households, and 65 families residing in the CDP. The population density was 17.9 people per square mile (6.9/km^{2}). There were 87 housing units at an average density of 5.6/sq mi (2.2/km^{2}). The racial makeup of the CDP was 1.08% White, 98.19% Native American, and 0.72% from two or more races.

There were 79 households, out of which 49.4% had children under the age of 18 living with them, 34.2% were married couples living together, 34.2% had a female householder with no husband present, and 17.7% were non-families. 16.5% of all households were made up of individuals, and 3.8% had someone living alone who was 65 years of age or older. The average household size was 3.51 and the average family size was 3.94.

In the CDP, the population was spread out, with 43.3% under the age of 18, 9.0% from 18 to 24, 32.9% from 25 to 44, 10.5% from 45 to 64, and 4.3% who were 65 years of age or older. The median age was 24 years. For every 100 females, there were 85.9 males. For every 100 females age 18 and over, there were 82.6 males.

The median income for a household in the CDP was $13,750, and the median income for a family was $14,583. Males had a median income of $31,250 versus $15,781 for females. The per capita income for the CDP was $8,053. About 48.6% of families and 52.8% of the population were below the poverty line, including 61.4% of those under the age of eighteen and 52.9% of those 65 or over.

== See also ==
- List of census-designated places in Utah
- Cisco, Utah
- Uranium mining
