= Virgin River =

Tributary of the Colorado River in the southwestern United States

Virgin River Virgen River, Rio de la Virgen
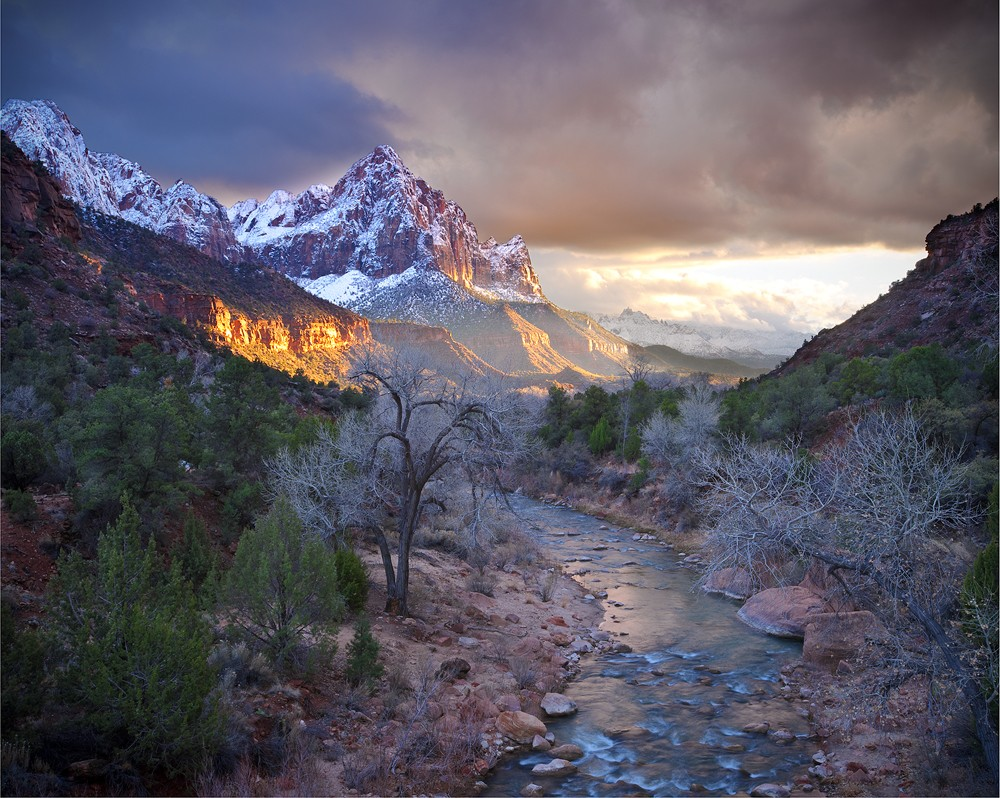
- Virgin River in Zion National Park

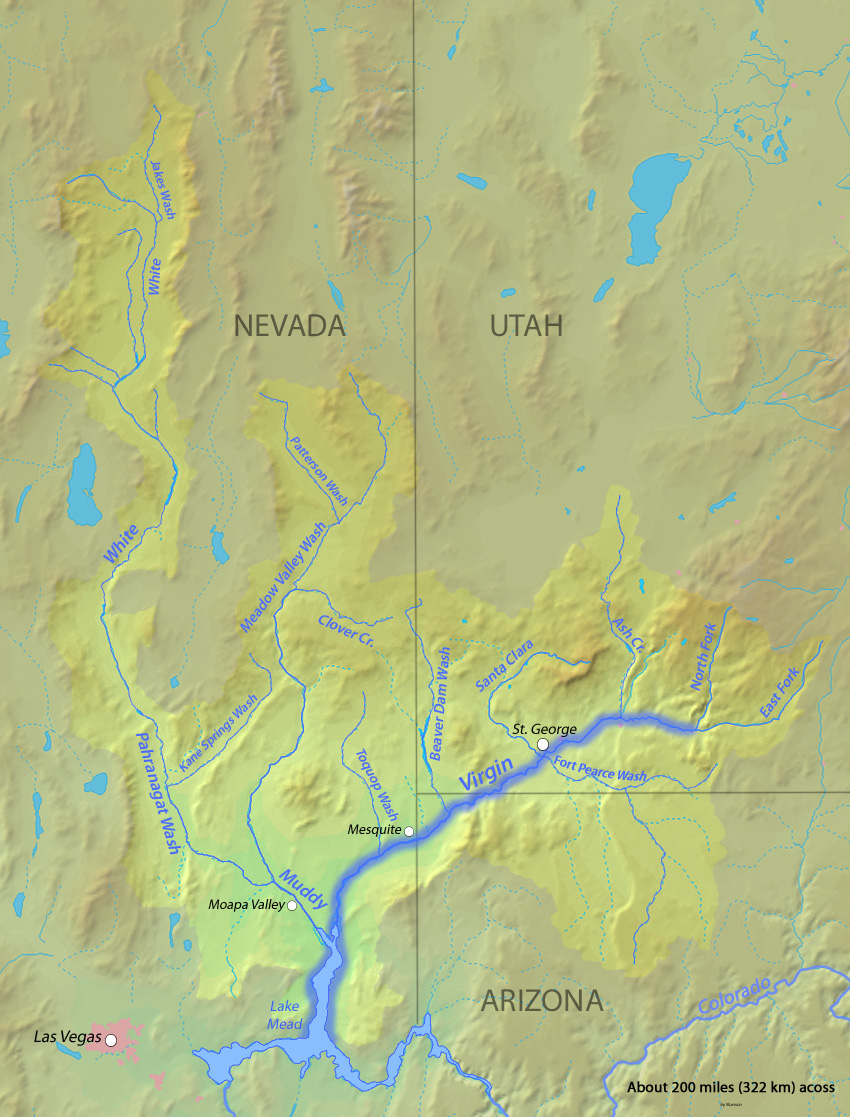
- The Virgin River watershed

Location
- Country: United States
- State: Nevada, Utah, Arizona

Physical characteristics
- Source: confluence of East Fork and North Fork
  - location: Navajo Reservoir, Dixie National Forest, Utah
  - coordinates: 37°9′44″N 113°0′51″W
  - elevation: 3,763 ft (1,147 m)
- Mouth: Colorado River
  - location: Lake Mead, Lake Mead National Recreation Area
  - coordinates: 36°8′46″N 114°24′59″W
  - elevation: 1,204 ft (367 m)
- Length: 162 mi (261 km)
- Basin size: 12,250 sq mi (31,700 km^{2})approx.
- Discharge
  - location: St. George, Utah
  - average: 183 cu ft/s (5.2 m^{3}/s)
  - minimum: 0 cu ft/s (0 m^{3}/s)
  - maximum: 55,000 cu ft/s (1,600 m^{3}/s)

Basin features
- River system: North and East Forks Virgin River
- Tributaries
  - left: Fort Pearce Wash
  - right: Ash Creek, Santa Clara River, Beaver Dam Wash, Toquop Wash, Muddy River

National Wild and Scenic River
- Type: Wild 145.4 miles (234.0 km); Scenic 11.3 miles (18.2 km); Recreational 12.6 miles (20.3 km)
- Designated: March 30, 2009

The Virgin River is a tributary of the Colorado River in the U.S. states of Utah, Nevada, and Arizona. The river is about 162 miles (261 km) long. It was designated Utah's first wild and scenic river in 2009, during the centennial celebration of Zion National Park.

== History ==
The first known Euro-American party to encounter the Virgin was led by Jedediah Smith in 1826. Smith named it "Adams River", after then-president John Quincy Adams. Later explorer and mapmaker John C. Fremont reported that it was called "Rio Virgen" but did not state the origin of the name. Hiram Chittenden speculated that Smith had later renamed the river after Thomas Virgin, who was badly wounded in an 1827 attack by Mohave people during the crossing of the Mojave Desert. Virgin recovered from his wounds but was later killed, along with most of Smith's companions, in an attack by Umpqua people (in present-day Oregon).

The Old Spanish Trail followed the Virgin River for part of its length from near St. George to the point it ascended the Mormon Plateau to cross to the Muddy River in present-day Nevada.

== Course ==
Route of the Virgin River (red) and the North Fork (blue) that flows through Zion National Park and the East Fork (purple)

The origin of the Virgin River is in Southwestern Utah, north of Zion National Park, and is formed by the confluence of the East Fork Virgin with the North Fork Virgin River. The East Fork of the Virgin River originates above Long Valley and that flows through Mount Carmel Junction on the east side of Zion National Park and Parunaweap Canyon. The North Fork of the Virgin river begins at Cascade Falls which comes out of a cave near the Navajo Reservoir in the Dixie National Forest. Both the North and East Forks of the Virgin River run through Zion Canyon in Zion National Park. The combined river then flows in a southwesterly direction, passing south of the old townsite of St. George where the Fort Pearce Wash and the Santa Clara River both join the Virgin at a place the Paiutes called Tonaquint. The river then flows across the northwestern corner of Arizona through the Virgin River Gorge and past the towns of Beaver Dam and Littlefield. It enters southern Nevada near the town of Mesquite and empties into the Colorado at the Lake Mead reservoir, approximately 40 miles (64 km) east of Las Vegas. The last 30 miles (48 km) of the Virgin River forms the north arm of Lake Mead.

== Ecology ==
Despite flowing through an arid region, the Virgin River is home to a diverse array of plants and animals. Southwestern Utah is located at the intersection of three physiographic regions: the Colorado Plateau, the Great Basin, and the Mojave Desert. The landscapes and habitats of this region harbor unique plant and animal communities and species found nowhere else in the world. Without the water of the Virgin River system, these species could not exist. The Virgin River directly supports hundreds of wildlife species, including woundfin, Virgin River chub, Virgin spinedace, flannelmouth sucker, desert sucker, speckled dace, and Southwestern Willow Flycatcher. Many of these species are endangered or are considered sensitive species within the State of Utah. The Virgin River Program was established to balance increasing human demand and maintain this unique system.

Woundfin (Plagopterus argentissimus) Federally listed endangered species Size: 4 in (10.2 cm)
One of the rarest species on earth, the endangered woundfin is found only in a small section of the Virgin River. Woundfin have large fins and scale-less, streamlined bodies that help them survive in swift, silty conditions. Although small, it is shark-like in both appearance and action as it feeds on small insects in shallow areas along the river. Woundfin live only one to two years, and their survival depends upon sufficient flow within the river, especially during hot summer months.

Virgin River chub (Gila seminuda) Federally listed endangered species Size: 18 in (46.4 cm)
Rare and beautiful, this fish is the top native predator in the Virgin River. Chub is a fast, streamlined fish with a sloped forehead, humped back, and thin, rounded tail. The Virgin River chub feeds on small fish, insects, and plant matter. Chub prefer deep pools and runs with boulders and debris for cover. Virgin River chub were once an important food source for Native Americans and early pioneers. Listed as an endangered species, the Virgin River chub is found from Pah Tempe Hot Springs down to Halfway Wash, Nevada.

Desert sucker (Catostomus clarkii) State of Utah wildlife species of concern Size: 18 in (46.4 cm)
The desert sucker gets its name from the way it feeds on aquatic vegetation and insects. It uses its thick cartilaginous lips to scrape and suck food from rocks and boulders along the bottom of the river. Desert Suckers are very colorful during the spring spawning season, developing bright orange and black 'racing stripes' along their sides. Desert suckers are considered a sensitive species in Utah, where they are only found in the Virgin River and its tributaries.

Speckled dace (Rhinichthys osculus) Size: 4 in (10.2 cm)
One of the most widespread species in western North America, the speckled dace is found in large numbers throughout the Virgin River and its tributaries. Speckled dace prefer rocky areas but are comfortable living in all habitats and stream sizes. Speckled dace exhibit a kaleidoscope of shapes and colors across their range. Males display bright red "lipstick" and red fins to attract mates during the breeding season.

Southwestern Willow Flycatcher (Empidonax traillii extimus) Federally listed endangered species
The Willow in the Southwest In thick riparian environments around streams, rivers, and other wetlands, flycatchers can be found. The flycatcher breeds in dense, patchy environments made up of medium-sized to towering trees and shrubs at low elevations. It grows in dense populations of riparian bushes that range in height from low to moderate at higher elevations. In particular, the density of vegetation inside 4 m (13 ft) is significant. It is nearly usually the case that standing or slowly moving water is present in preferred environments. The destruction of riparian habitats has caused a severe decline in the populations of the southwestern willow flycatcher. Currently, this sub-species exists only in fragmented and scattered locations throughout its range. Historically, the breeding range reached from southern California, southern Nevada, southern Utah, Arizona, New Mexico, western Texas, southwestern Colorado, and northwestern Mexico. The flycatcher is a migratory bird that winters in Mexico, Central America, and northern South America. Currently, the breeding range for the flycatcher is similar to the historic range, though much of the riparian habitat in the southwest has been degraded by agricultural practices, invasion of non-native vegetation and urban development. The Southwestern Willow Flycatcher is an insectivore, taking insects from the air, or picking them from the foliage. The Southwestern Willow Flycatcher is present on breeding grounds by mid-May. By late May, nests are built, usually in a branched tree fork near the water. Typically, three eggs are laid and then incubated for 12–13 days.

Virgin spinedace (Lepidomeda mollispinis mollispinis) State conservation species Size: 5 in (12.7 cm)
The Virgin spinedace looks, feeds, and behaves like a miniature trout. This silvery minnow gets its name from the sharp spiny rays in its dorsal fin. Virgin spinedace are found only in the Virgin River Basin. Unlike the woundfin and chub, which live only in the Virgin River, spinedace are also found throughout many tributary streams. Virgin Spinedace prefer deep pools and runs and are at home in both clear and turbid water.

Flannelmouth sucker (Catostomus latipinnis) State conservation species Size: 2.13 ft (64.8 cm)
The flannelmouth sucker is the largest native fish in the Virgin River, growing over two feet in length and weighing over six pounds. The flannelmouth's thick fleshy lips contain taste buds that help it find food along the bottom of the river, including aquatic invertebrates, organic debris and algae. Flannelmouth suckers are usually found in deep sandy areas of the Virgin River, but large numbers congregate in shallow gravel areas for spawning in the spring. Water in the river's lower valley provides irrigation for the cultivation of cotton, pomegranates, and figs.

The Nevada river valley's significance is commemorated by Nevada Historical Marker 56.

== Virgin River Gorge ==
The scenic Virgin River Gorge is in northwest Arizona just south of the Utah state line. It is a popular winter rock climbing area noted for its steep and overhanging limestone walls. Interstate 15 follows the Virgin River for several miles through the Virgin River Gorge.

== Gallery ==
Virgin River

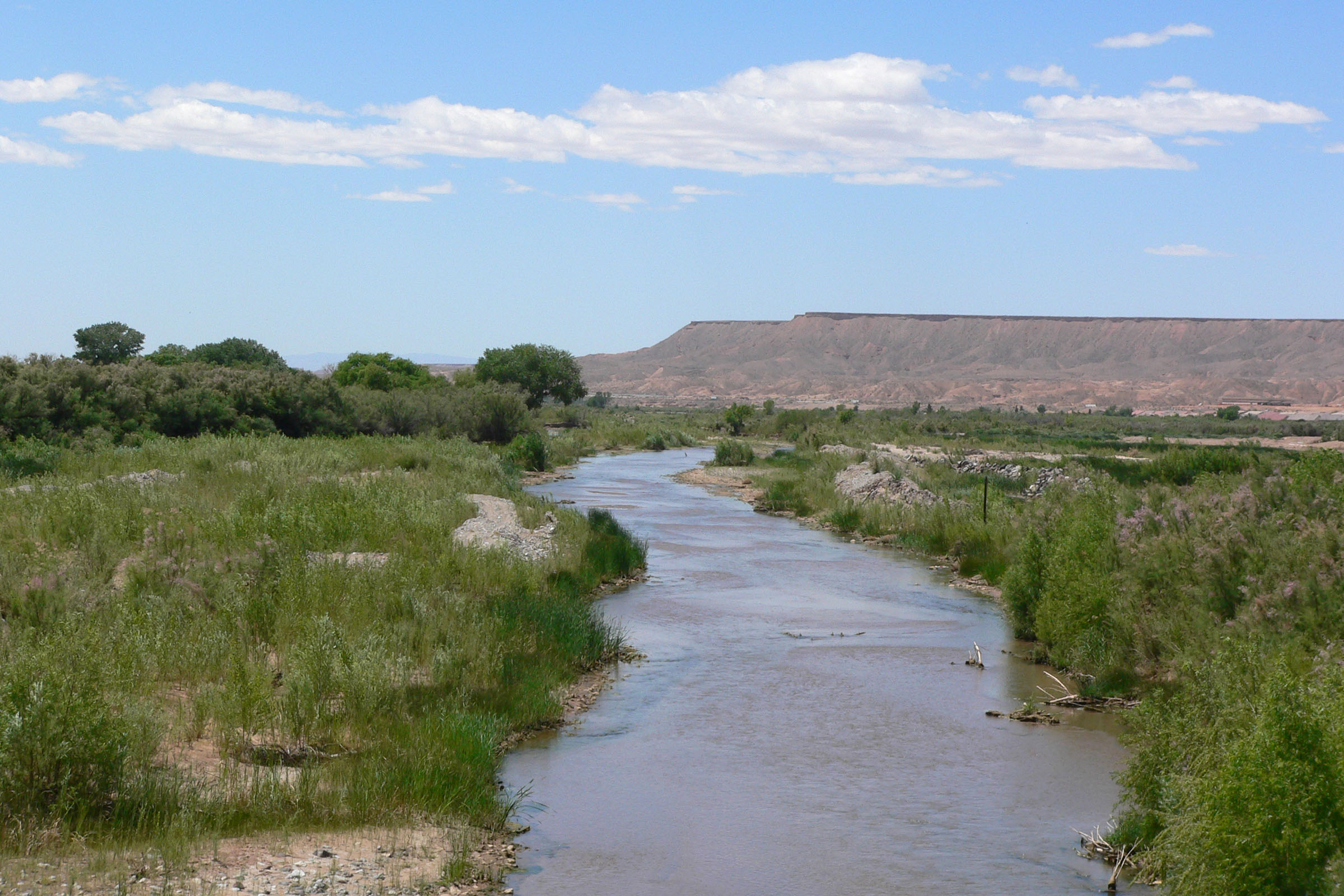
View of the lower river, between Mesquite and Lake Mead

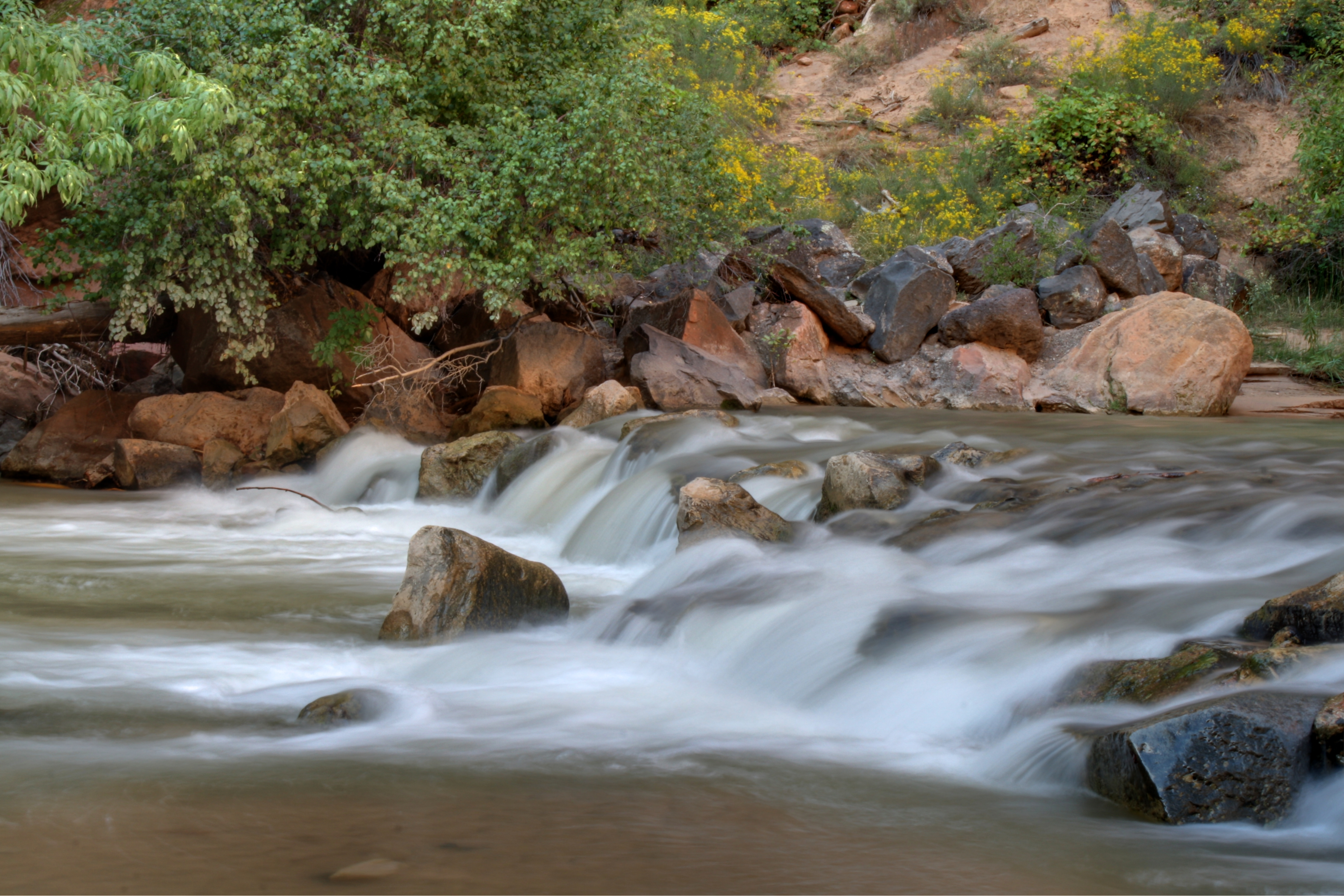
Small rock waterfall in the Virgin River's north fork, passing through Zion National Park

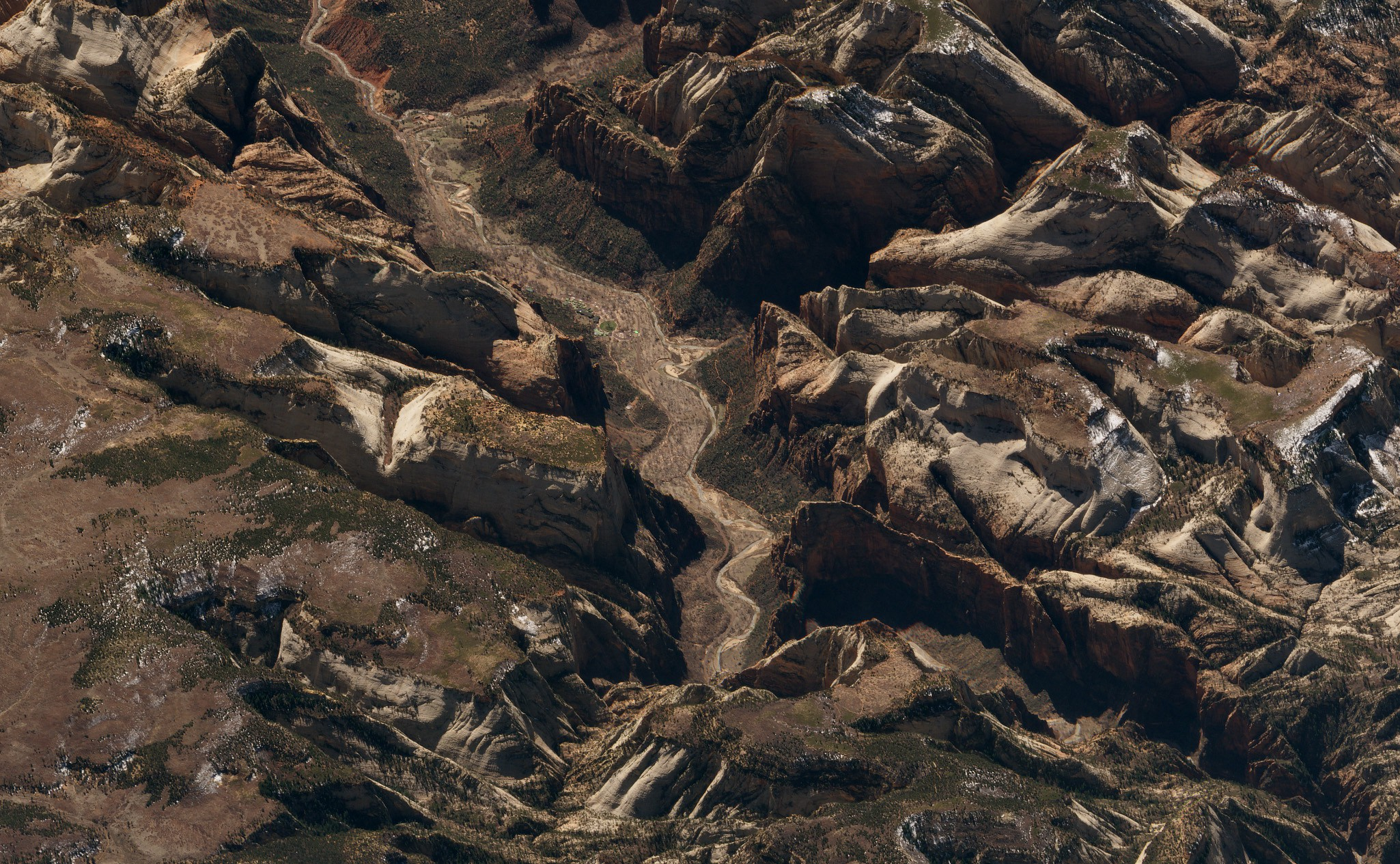
Satellite image of the Virgin River in Zion National Park

== See also ==
- List of rivers of Utah
- List of rivers of Nevada
- List of rivers of Arizona
- List of tributaries of the Colorado River
