= Kaibab Indian Reservation =

Kaibab Indian Reservation Kai'vi'vits (Ute-Southern Paiute)
- Indian Reservation
- The reservation in Mohave County, with its southeastern corner shown extending into adjacent Coconino County
- Coordinates: 36°54′46″N 112°40′46″W

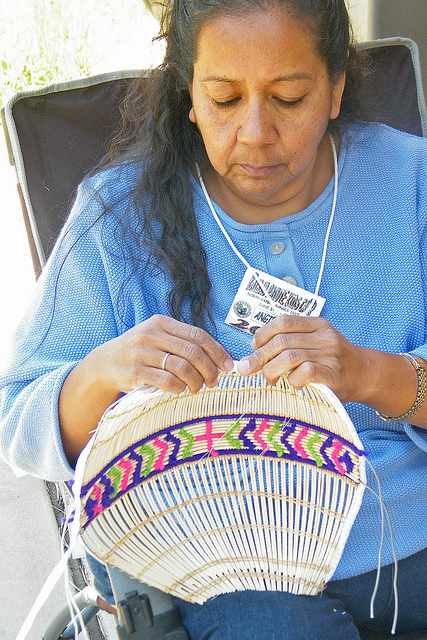
Angie Bulletts (Kaibab Paiute) weaves a Paiute cradleboard, Arizona, 2011

The Kaibab Indian Reservation is the home of the Kaibab Band of Paiute Indians (Southern Paiute Language: Kai'vi'vits), a federally recognized tribe of Southern Paiutes. The Indian reservation is located in northern part of the U.S. state of Arizona. It covers a land area of 188.75 square miles (488.9 km^{2}) in northeastern Mohave County and northwestern Coconino County adjacent to the southern Utah border. The Pipe Spring National Monument lies in the southwestern section of the reservation. The Thunder Mountain Pootseev Dark-sky preserve is colocated with the reservation.

As of the 2000 census, its population was 196.

== History ==
Historically, the Kaibab Southern Paiute were a semi-sedentary group who resided in modern-day northern Arizona and southern Utah, and one of the last groups of Native Americans to resist European colonialism. Their diet relied on the abundant natural flora and fauna found within their territory: cacti, berries, trees, fruits, roots, rodents, big cats, reptiles, insects, and other herbivores. Kaibab Paiute people utilized their permanent water sources for garden irrigation. They grew maize, beans, and squash using water from the Kanab creek - a major perennial stream - and artesian springs along the Vermillion Cliffs. In the 1860s, Mormon settlers usurped all of the Kaibab Paiute's permanent water sources in order to continue their development. This contributed to a significant population decline of the Kaibab Paiute people. After the arrival of Mormon settlers, approximately 82% of Kaibab Paiutes died, most from starvation. In 1909, the Kaibab Indian Reservation was established and it currently houses 76 Kaibab Paiute people.

== Geography ==
According to the U.S. Census Bureau, the reservation has a total area of 188.75 square miles (488.9 km^{2}), almost all land.

== Demographics ==
As of the census of 2000, there were 196 people, 65 households, and 49 families residing on the reservation. The population density was 1 inhabitant per square mile (0.39/km^{2}). There were 88 housing units at an average density of 0.5/sq mi (0.19/km^{2}). The racial makeup of the reservation was 23.5% White, 66.8% Native American, 4.6% from other races, and 5.1% from two or more races, with no persons identifying as Black or African American, Asian, or Pacific Islander. 10.2% of the population were Hispanic or Latino of any race.

There were 65 households, out of which 61.5% had children under the age of 18 living with them, 36.9% were married couples living together, 32.3% had a female householder with no husband present, and 24.6% were non-families. 23.1% of all households were made up of individuals, and 1.5% had someone living alone who was 65 years of age or older. The average household size was 3.02 and the average family size was 3.49.

On the reservation the population was spread out, with 44.4% under the age of 18, 9.7% from 18 to 24, 24.5% from 25 to 44, 19.9% from 45 to 64, and 1.5% who were 65 years of age or older. The median age was 22 years. For every 100 females there were 73.45 males. For every 100 females age 18 and over, there were 75.81 males.

The median income for a household on the reservation was $20,000, and the median income for a family was $21,250. Males had a median income of $22,000 versus $16,607 for females. The per capita income for the reservation was $7,951. About 29.69% of families and 31.65% of the population were below the poverty line.

== Education ==
The reservation is served by the Fredonia-Moccasin Unified School District.
