= Colorado River Numic language =

Dialect chain of the Numic branch of the Uto-Aztecan language family

Colorado River Numic
- Southern Paiute
- Native to: United States
- Region: Nevada, California, Utah, Arizona, Colorado, New Mexico
- Ethnicity: 6,200 Chemehuevi, Southern Paiute and Ute (2007)
- Native speakers: 920 (2007); 20 monolinguals (1990 census)
- Language family: Uto-Aztecan: Numic; Southern Numic; Colorado River Numic
- Dialects: Chemehuevi; Southern Paiute; Ute

Language codes
- ISO 639-3: ute
- Glottolog: utes1238
- ELP: Ute

- Chemehuevi is classified as Critically Endangered by the UNESCO Atlas of the World's Languages in Danger.

Colorado River Numic (also called Ute /ˈjuːt/ YOOT, Southern Paiute /ˈpaɪ.juːt/ PIE-yoot, Ute–Southern Paiute, or Ute-Chemehuevi /ˌtʃɛ.mə.ˈweɪ.vi/ CHEH-mə-WAY-vee), of the Numic branch of the Uto-Aztecan language family, is a dialect chain that stretches from southeastern California to Colorado. Individual dialects are Chemehuevi, which is in danger of extinction, Southern Paiute (Moapa, Cedar City, Kaibab, and San Juan subdialects), and Ute (Central Utah, Northern, White Mesa, Southern subdialects). According to the Ethnologue, there were somewhat fewer than two thousand speakers of Colorado River Numic Language in 1990, or around 40% out of an ethnic population of 5,000.

The Southern Paiute dialect has played a significant role in linguistics, as the background for a famous article by linguist Edward Sapir and his collaborator Tony Tillohash on the nature of the phoneme.

== Dialects ==
The three major dialect groups of Colorado River are Chemehuevi, Southern Paiute, and Ute, although there are no strong isoglosses. The threefold division is primarily one of culture rather than strictly linguistic. There are, however, three major phonological distinctions among the dialects:

- In Southern Paiute and Ute, initial /h/ has been lost: Chemehuevi /hivi/ 'drink' is a verb, other dialects /ivi/ 'drink'.
- In Ute, nasal-stop clusters have become voiceless geminate stops: Ute /pukku/ 'horse, pet', other dialects /puŋku/.
- In Ute, the mid back round vowel /o/ has been fronted to /ö/: Ute /söö-/ 'lungs', other dialects /soo-/.

There are no strong isoglosses between Southern Paiute and Ute for the changes but an increasing level of change, as one moves from Kaibab Southern Paiute (0% of nasal-stop clusters have changed) to Southern Ute (100% of nasal-stop clusters have changed).

== Phonology ==
Consonant and vowel charts for the westernmost and easternmost dialects are given.

=== Consonants ===
Consonant phonemes in Chemehuevi dialect
		labial	dental	palatal	velar		glottal
		labial	dental	palatal	plain	labial	glottal
plosive		p	t	ts	k	kʷ	ʔ
fricative		β	s		ɣ	ɣʷ	h
rhotic			ɾ				
nasal	plain	m	n		ŋ	ŋʷ	
nasal	glottalized	mˀ	nˀ		ŋˀ		
glide	plain	w		j			
glide	glottalized	wˀ		jˀ			

Consonant phonemes in Southern Ute dialect
	labial	dental	palatal	velar		glottal
	labial	dental	palatal	plain	labial	glottal
plosive	p	t	tʃ	k	kʷ	ʔ
fricative	β	s		ɣ	ɣʷ	
rhotic		ɾ				
nasal	m	n				
glide	w		j			

=== Vowels ===
Vowel phonemes in Chemehuevi dialect
	front	central	back	
	front	central	unrounded	rounded
high	i		ɯ	u
mid				o
low		ɑ		

Vowel phonemes in Southern Ute dialect
	front		central	back	
	unrounded	rounded	central	unrounded	rounded
high	i			ɯ	u
mid		ø			
low			ɑ		

Vowels can be long or short. Short unstressed vowels can be devoiced.

== Morphology ==
The Colorado River Numic language is an agglutinative language, in which words use suffix complexes for a variety of purposes with several morphemes strung together.

== Bibliography ==
- Bunte, Pamela A. (1979). Problems in Southern Paiute Syntax and Semantics (PhD dissertation). Indiana University.
- Charney, Jean O. (1996). A Dictionary of the Southern Ute Language. Ignacio, CO: Ute Press.
- Givón, Talmy (2011). Ute Reference Grammar. Culture and Language Use. Vol. 3. Amsterdam: John Benjamins Publishing.
- Laird, Carobeth (1976). The Chemehuevis. Banning, CA: Malki Museum Press.
- Mithun, Marianne (1999). Languages of Native North America. Cambridge: Cambridge University Press.
- Press, Margaret L. (1979). Chemehuevi, A Grammar and Lexicon. University of California Publications in Linguistics. Vol. 92. Berkeley, CA: University of California Press.
- Sapir, Edward (1992) [1930]. "Southern Paiute, a Shoshonean Language". In Bright, William (ed.). The Collected Works of Edward Sapir. Vol. X: Southern Paiute and Ute Linguistics and Ethnography. Berlin: Mouton de Gruyter. doi:10.1515/9783110886603. ISBN 978-3-11-013543-5.
- Sapir, Edward (1992) [1931]. "Southern Paiute Dictionary". In Bright, William (ed.). The Collected Works of Edward Sapir. Vol. X: Southern Paiute and Ute Linguistics and Ethnography. Berlin: Mouton de Gruyter. doi:10.1515/9783110886603. ISBN 978-3-11-013543-5.
