= Paria Point =

Mountain in the state of Utah

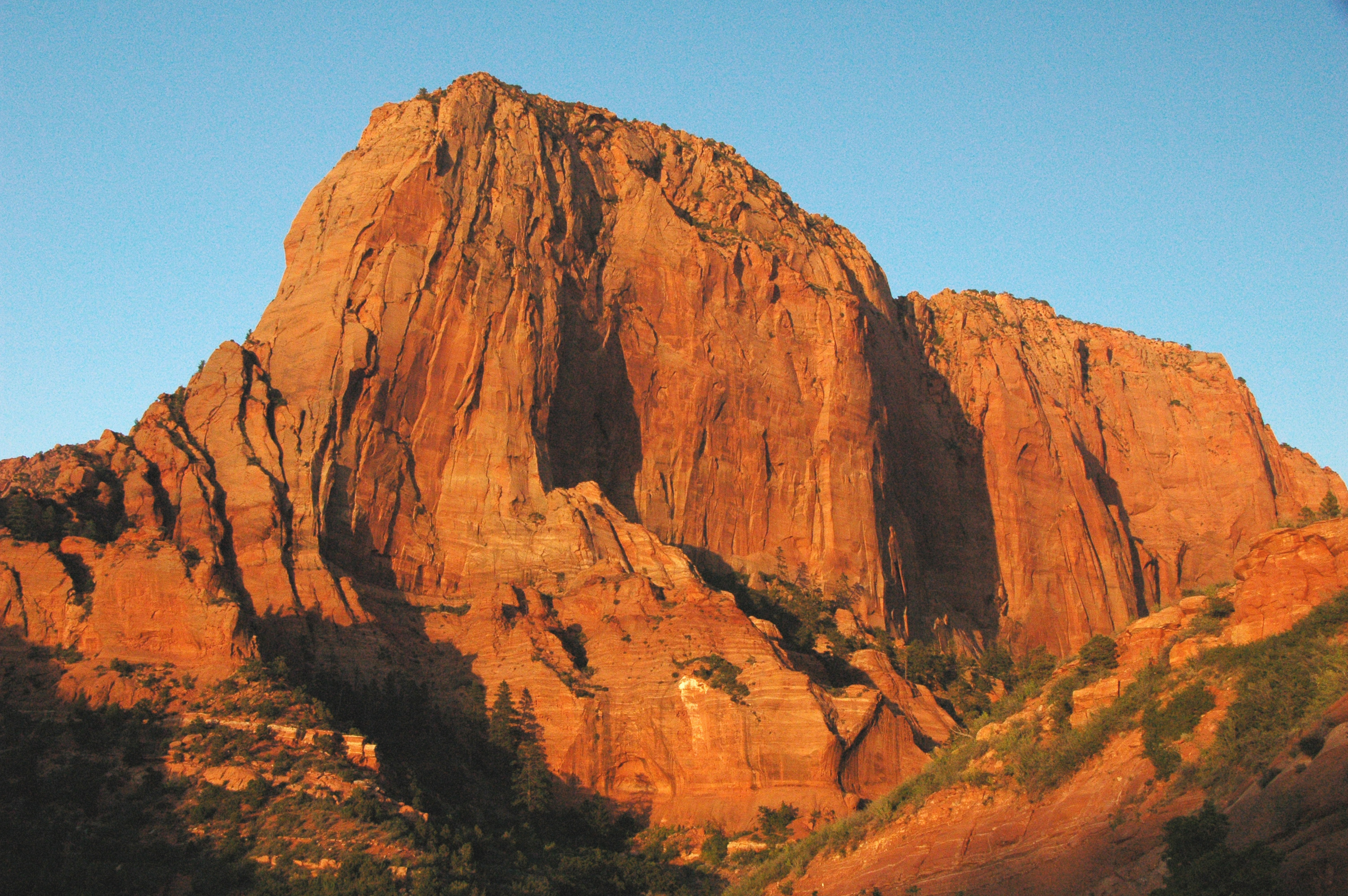
- Southwest aspect at sunset

Highest point
- Elevation: 7,802 ft (2,378 m)
- Prominence: 82 ft (25 m)
- Parent peak: Buck Pasture Mountain (8,030 ft)
- Isolation: 1.05 mi (1.69 km)
- Coordinates: 37°27′24″N 113°10′43″W

Geography
- Location within Utah Location within the United States
- Country: United States
- State: Utah
- County: Washington
- Protected area: Zion National Park
- Parent range: Colorado Plateau
- Topo map: USGS Kolob Arch

Geology
- Rock age: Jurassic
- Rock type: Navajo sandstone

Climbing
- Easiest route: class 2 scrambling

Paria Point is a 7,802-foot (2,378 m) elevation summit located in the Kolob Canyons section of Zion National Park, in Washington County, Utah, United States. Tucupit Point is situated 0.5 mi (0.80 km) immediately north, and Beatty Point is 0.5 mi (0.80 km) immediately south, with 2,000-foot-deep finger canyons between each. Other neighbors include Nagunt Mesa and Timber Top Mountain to the south, and Horse Ranch Mountain to the north. Paria Point is composed of Jurassic Navajo sandstone overlaying tilted Kayenta Formation. Precipitation runoff drains into Taylor Creek, which is part of the Virgin River drainage basin. This feature's paria name is a Paiute word meaning "muddy water" or "elk water".

== Climate ==
Spring and fall are the most favorable seasons to visit Paria Point. According to the Köppen climate classification system, it is located in a Cold semi-arid climate zone, which is defined by the coldest month having an average mean temperature below 32 °F (0 °C), and at least 50% of the total annual precipitation being received during the spring and summer. This desert climate receives less than 10 inches (250 millimeters) of annual rainfall, and snowfall is generally light during the winter.

== Gallery ==
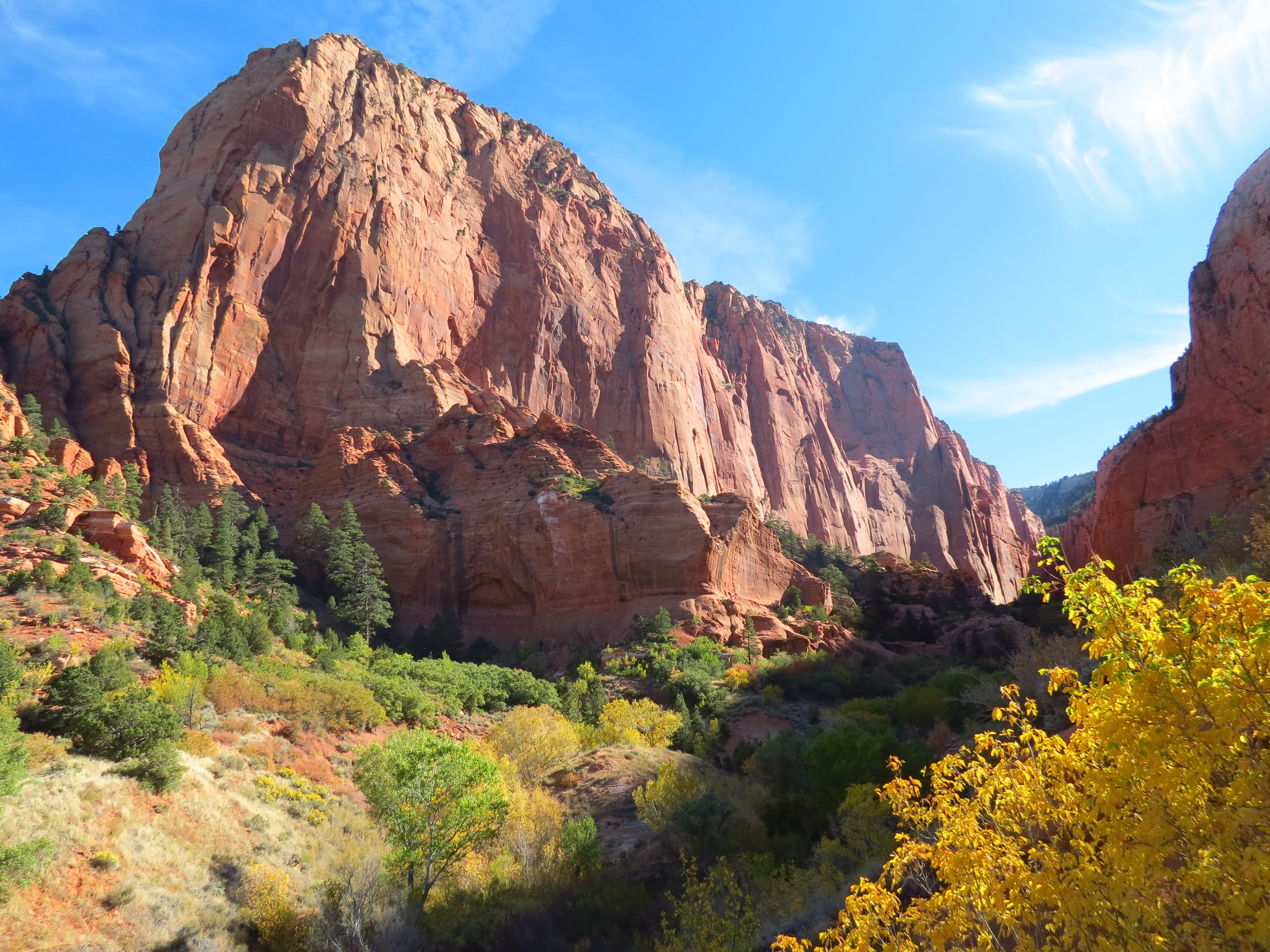
Southwest aspect

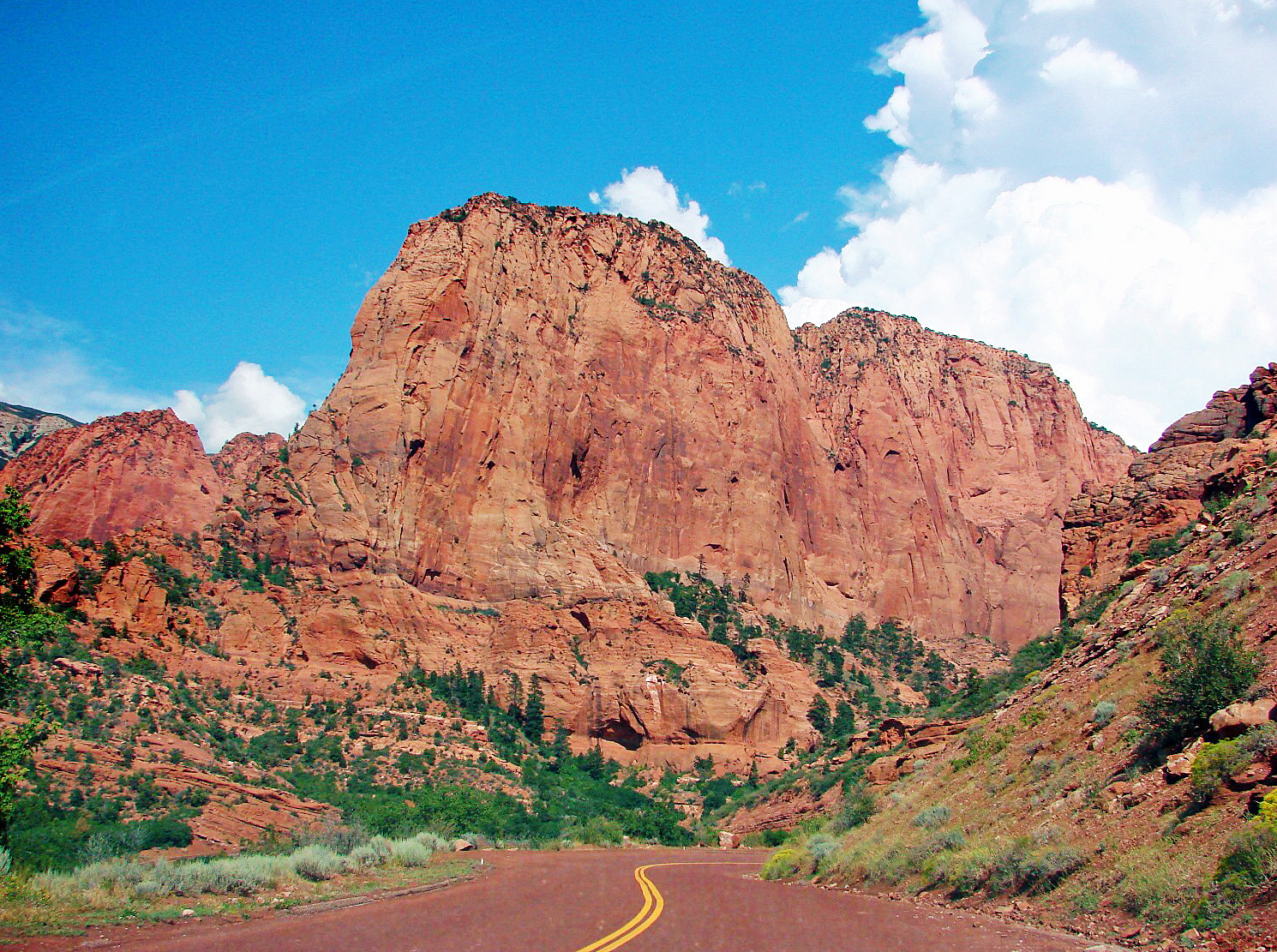
Southwest aspect

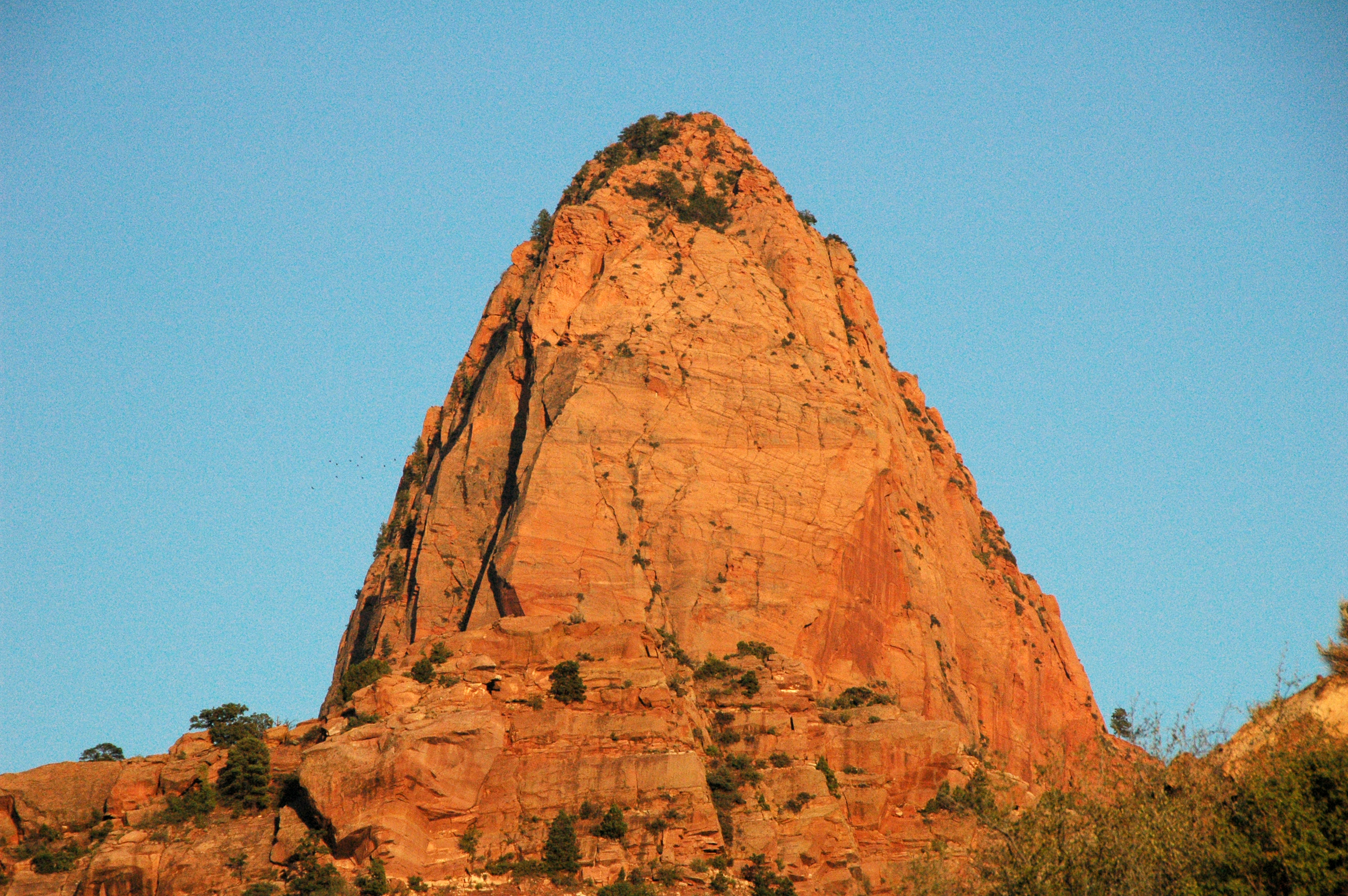
West aspect

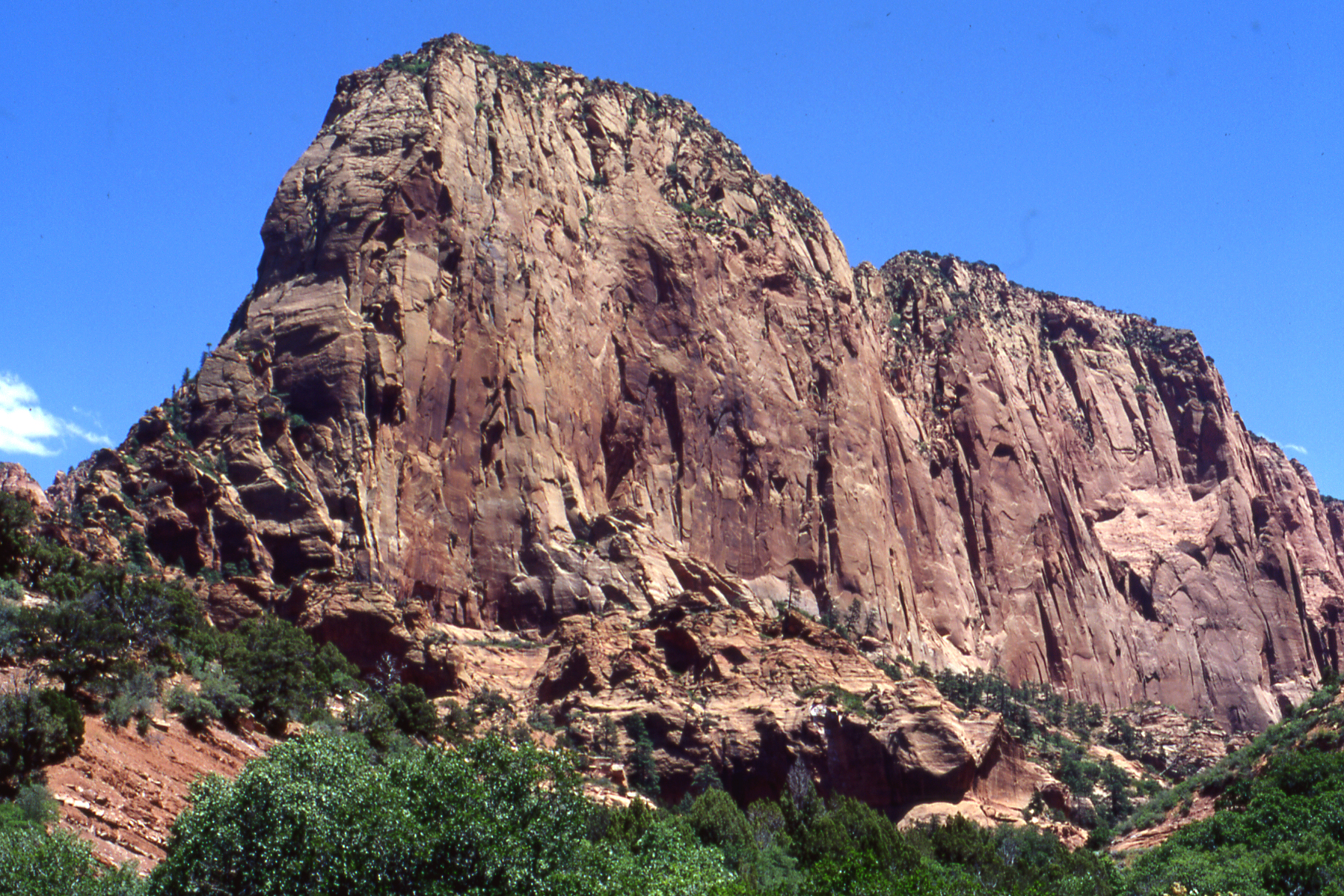
Southwest aspect

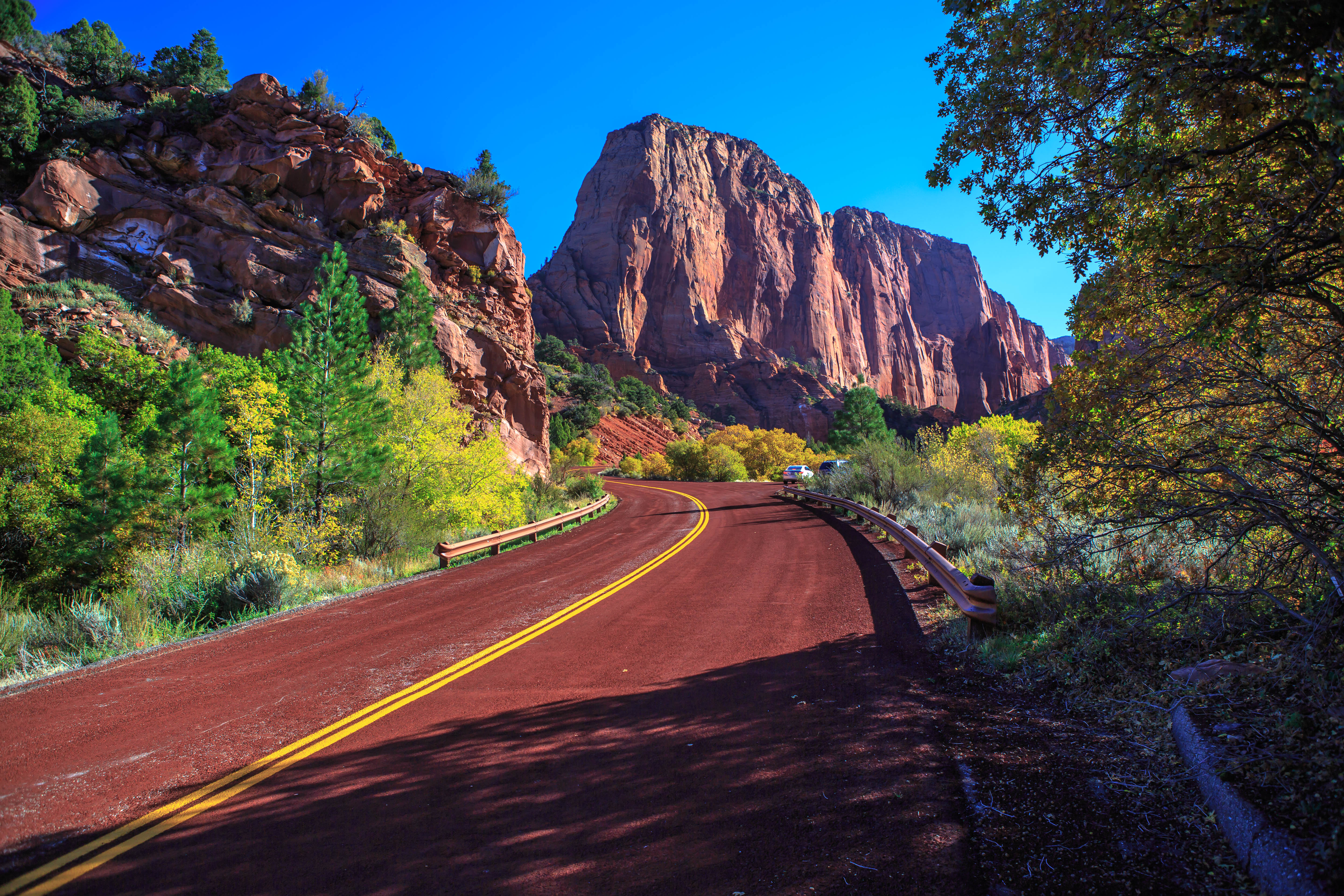
Southwest aspect

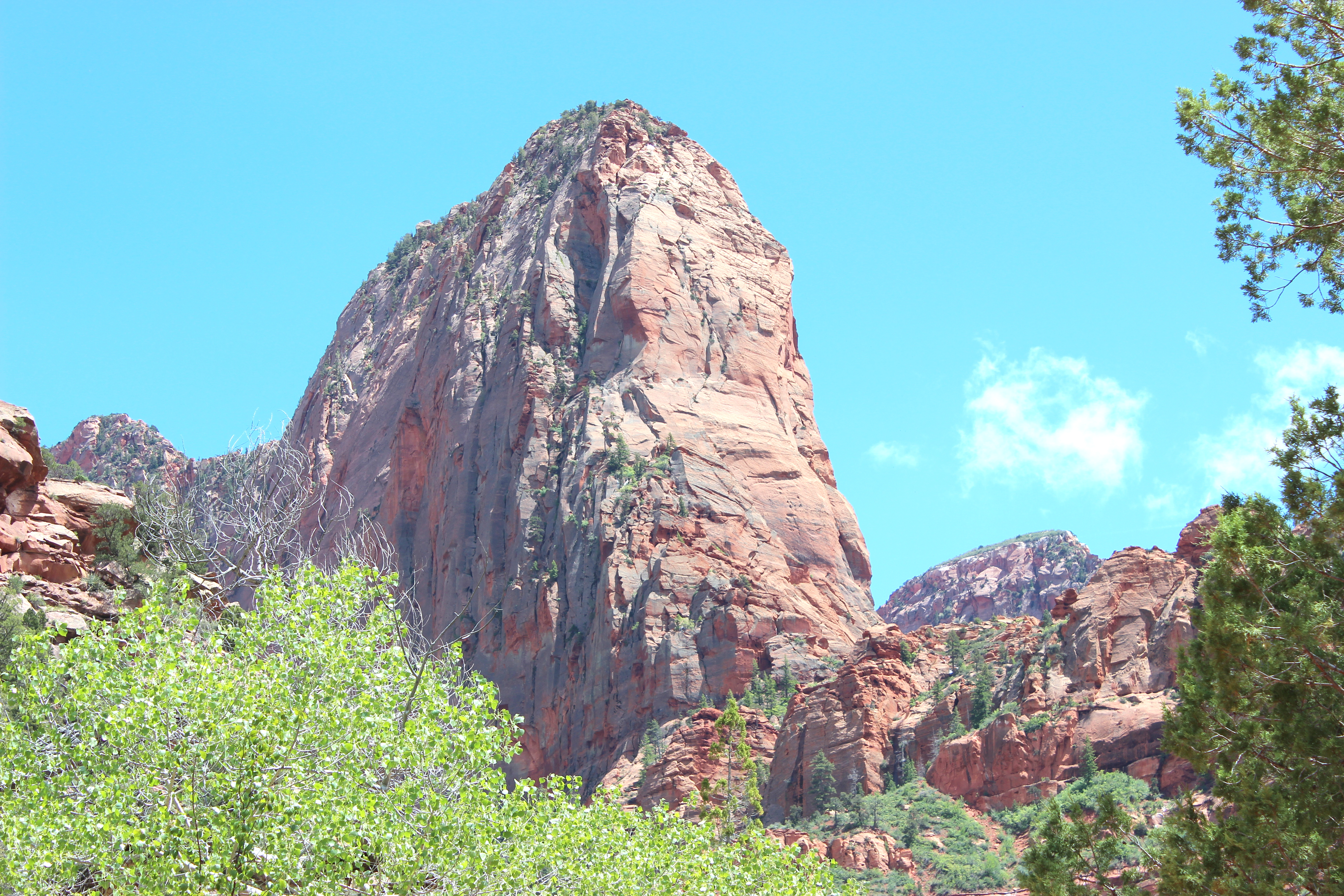
Northwest aspect

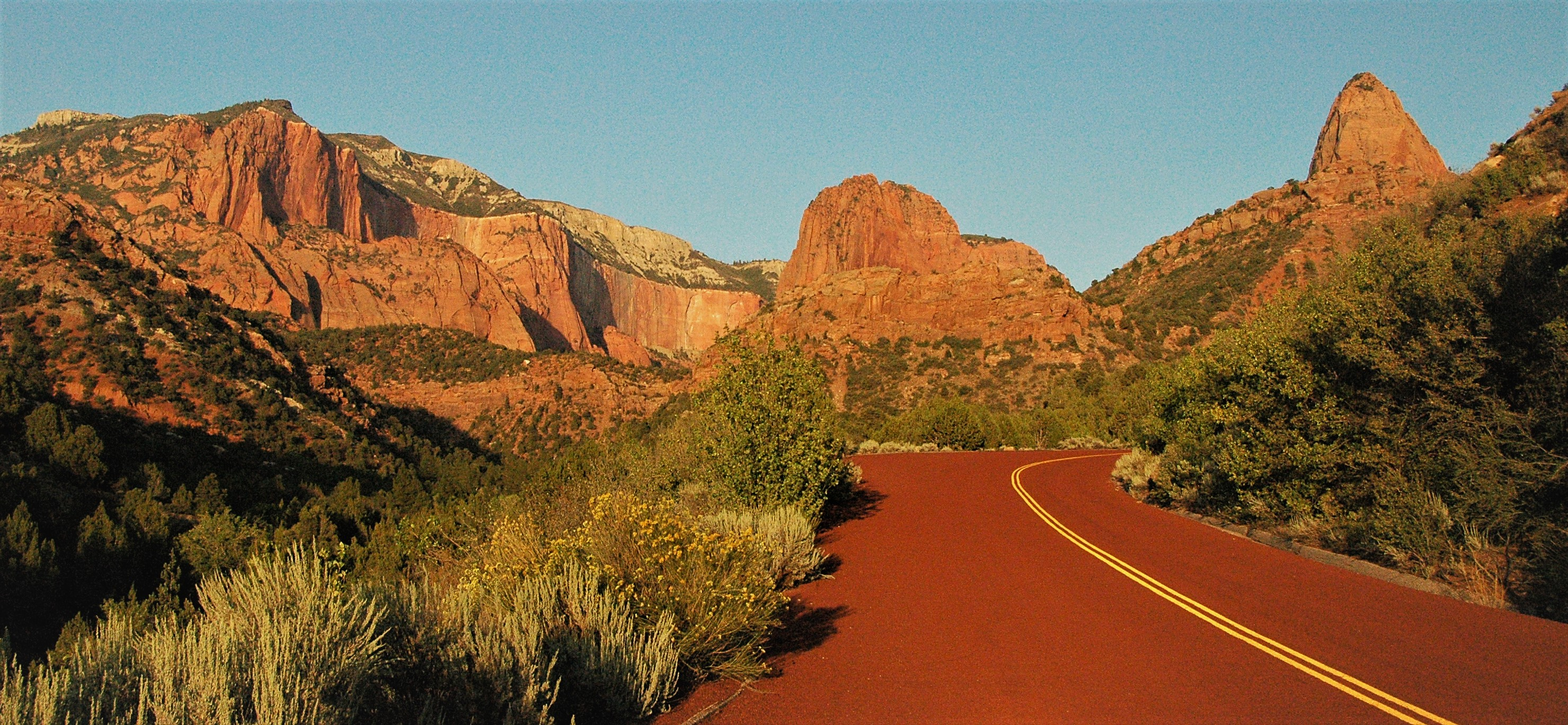
Horse Ranch Mountain, Tucupit Point, and Paria Point from west

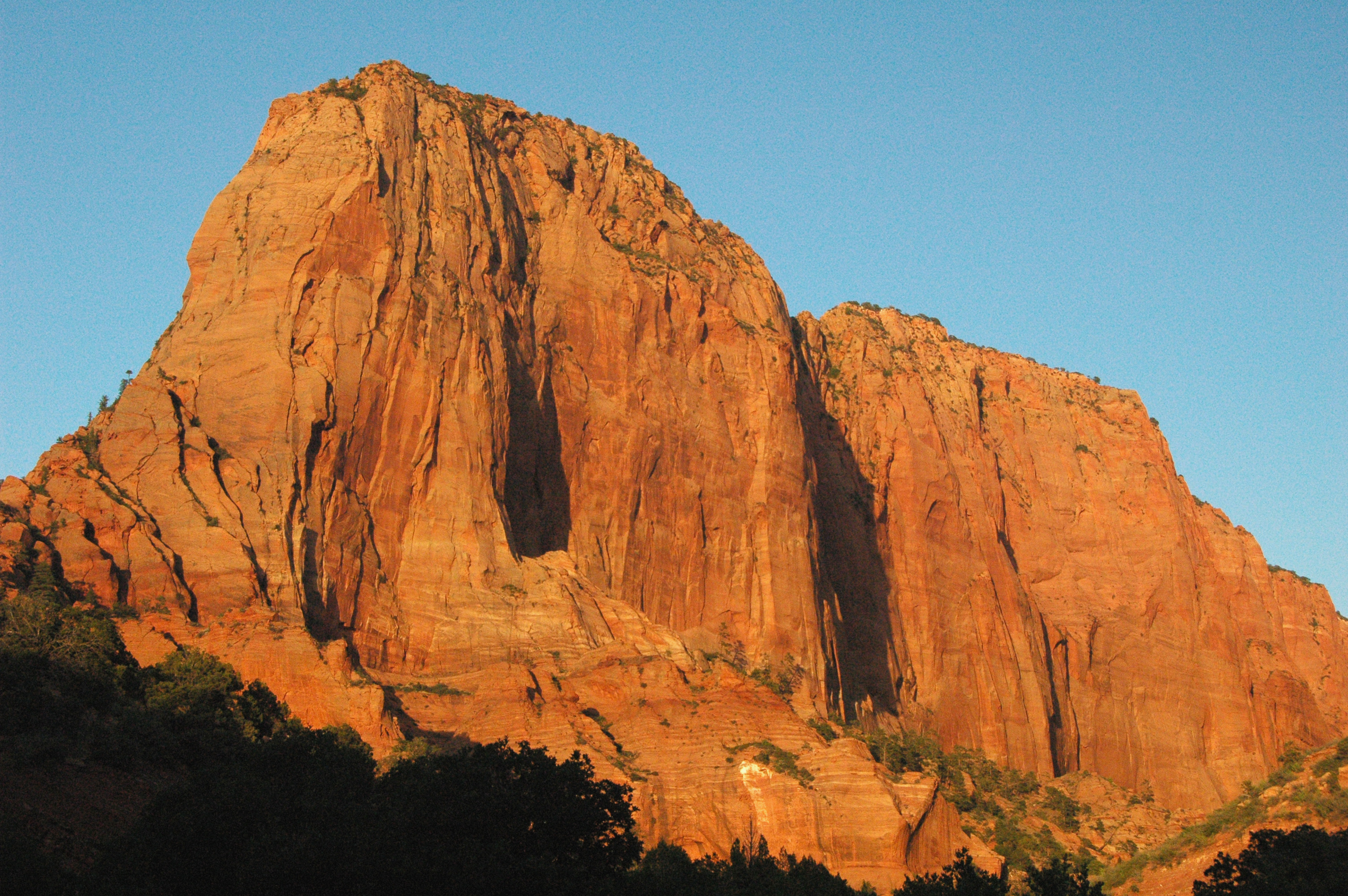
Southwest aspect

== See also ==
- List of mountains in Utah
- Geology of the Zion and Kolob canyons area
- Colorado Plateau
