= Beatty Point (Utah) =

Mountain in the U.S. state of Utah

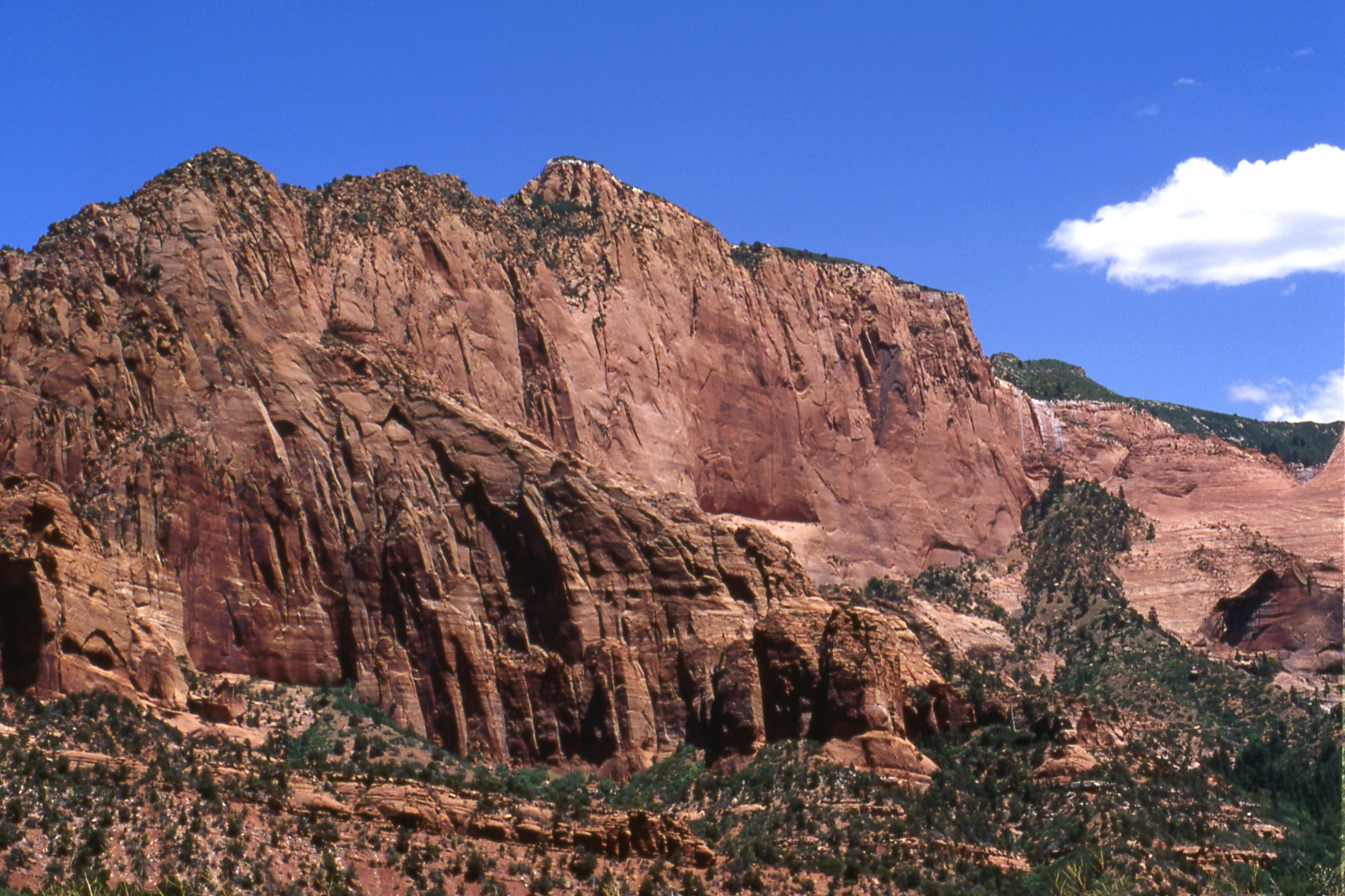
- Southwest aspect

Highest point
- Elevation: 7,780 ft (2,370 m)
- Prominence: 140 ft (43 m)
- Parent peak: Nagunt Mesa (7,785 ft)
- Isolation: 0.67 mi (1.08 km)
- Listing: Mountains of Utah
- Coordinates: 37°27′00″N 113°10′22″W

Geography
- Location within Utah Location within the United States
- Country: United States
- State: Utah
- County: Washington
- Protected area: Zion National Park
- Parent range: Colorado Plateau
- Topo map: USGS Kolob Arch

Geology
- Rock age: Jurassic
- Rock type: Navajo sandstone

Climbing
- Easiest route: class 2 scrambling

Beatty Point is a 7,780-foot (2,370 m) elevation summit located in the Kolob Canyons area of Zion National Park in Washington County, Utah, United States.

== Description ==
Paria Point is situated 0.5 mi (0.80 km) immediately north, and Nagunt Mesa is 0.57 mi (0.92 km) immediately south, with 2,000-foot-deep finger canyons between each. Other neighbors include Timber Top Mountain 1.85 mi (2.98 km)to the south-southwest, and Tucupit Point to the north. Beatty Point is composed of Jurassic Navajo sandstone overlaying tilted Kayenta Formation. Precipitation runoff drains into Timber Creek and Taylor Creek, which are both part of the Virgin River drainage basin. This geographical feature's name honors the Beatty family of Toquerville, Utah. Walter Lamb Beatty served as a guide for 20 years in Zion National Park.

== Climate ==
Spring and fall are the most favorable seasons to visit Beatty Point. According to the Köppen climate classification system, it is located in a Cold semi-arid climate zone, which is defined by the coldest month having an average mean temperature below 32 °F (0 °C), and at least 50% of the total annual precipitation being received during the spring and summer. This desert climate receives less than 10 inches (250 millimeters) of annual rainfall, and snowfall is generally light during the winter.

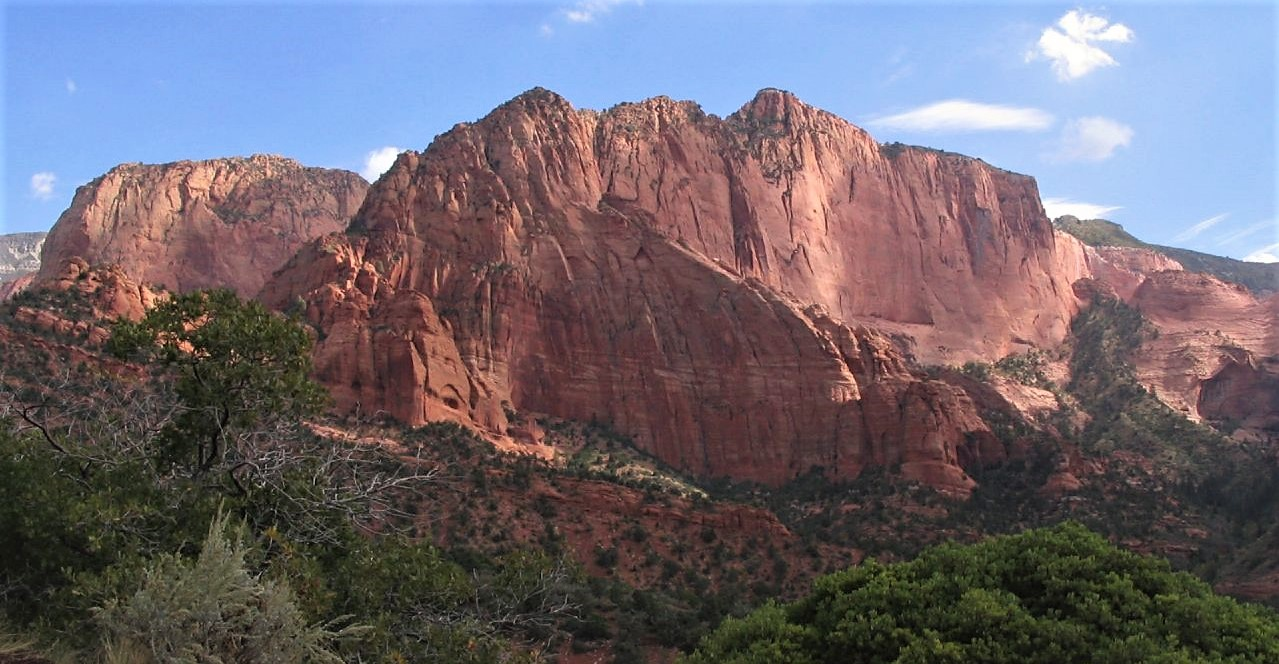
Beatty Point centered, from southwest. (Paria Point to left)

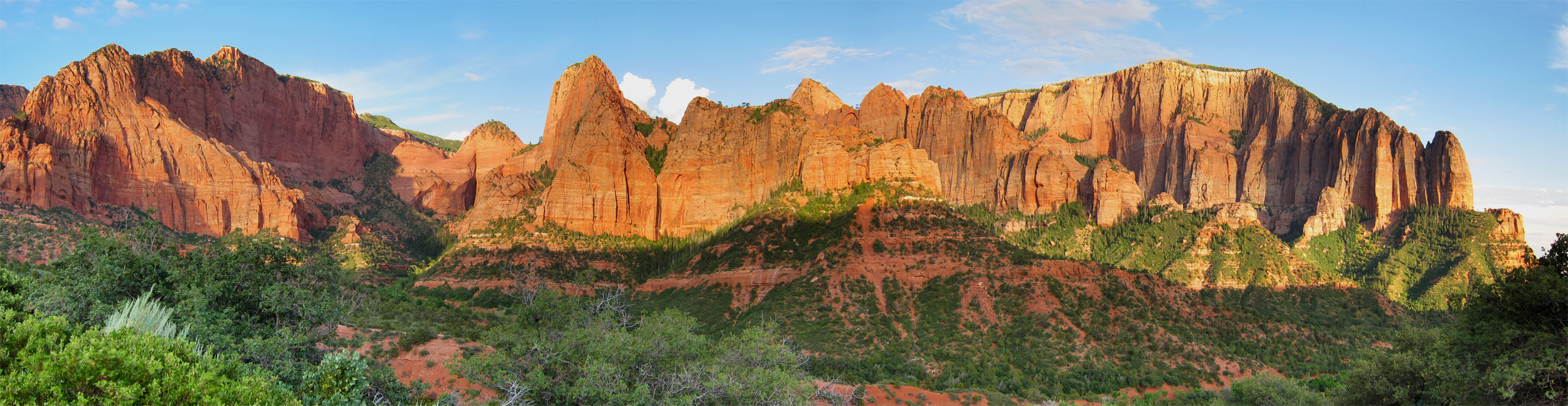
Kolob Canyons: Beatty Point (left), Nagunt Mesa (left of center), Timber Top Mountain (right)

== See also ==
- Geology of the Zion and Kolob canyons area
- Colorado Plateau
