= Nagunt Mesa =

Mountain in the state of Utah

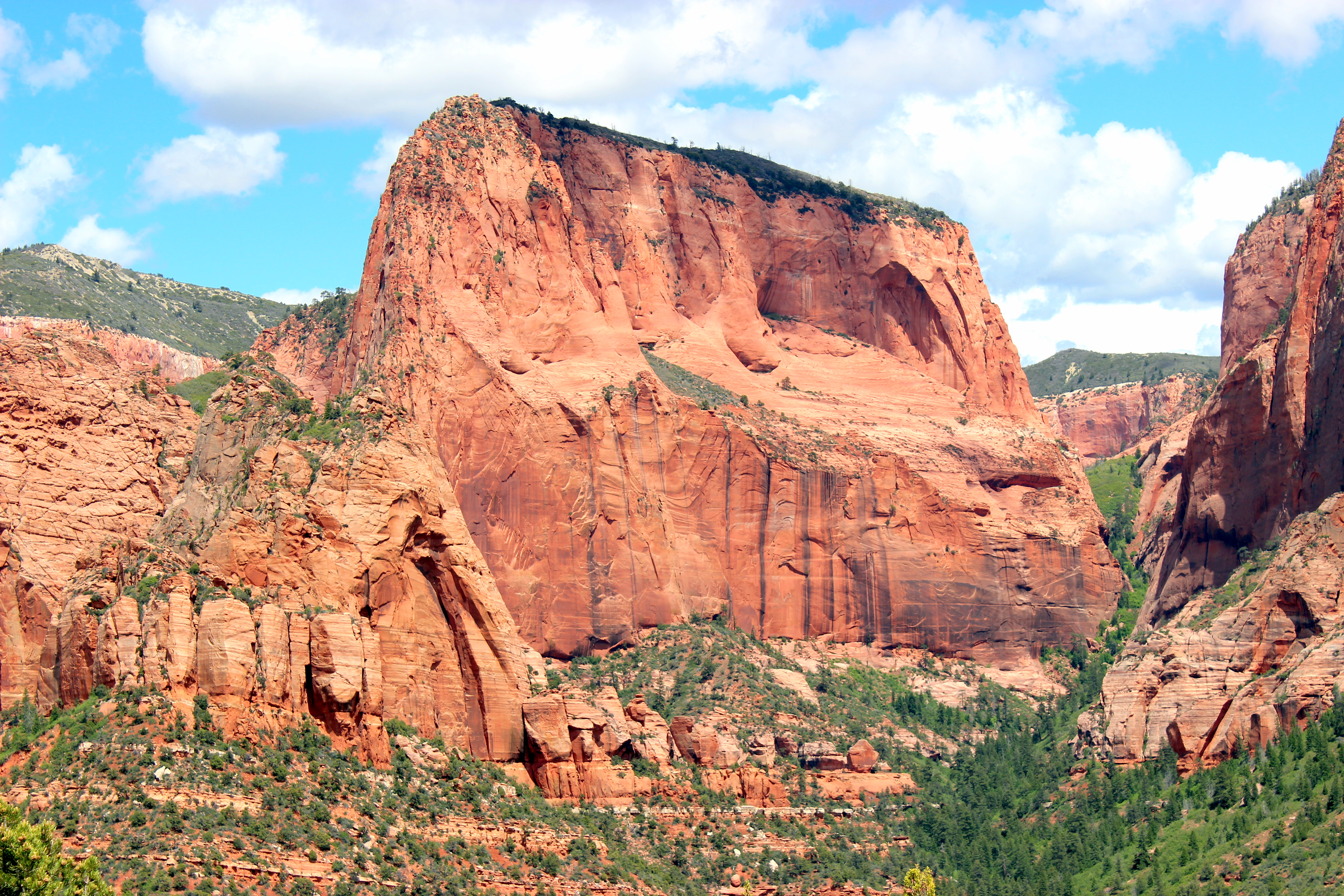
- Nagunt Mesa from the west

Highest point
- Elevation: 7,785 ft (2,373 m)
- Prominence: 905 ft (276 m)
- Parent peak: Timber Top Mountain (8,055 ft)
- Isolation: 0.90 mi (1.45 km)
- Coordinates: 37°26′27″N 113°10′10″W

Geography
- Location within Utah Location within the United States
- Country: United States
- State: Utah
- County: Washington
- Protected area: Zion National Park
- Parent range: Colorado Plateau
- Topo map: USGS Kolob Arch

Geology
- Rock age: Jurassic
- Rock type: Navajo sandstone

Climbing
- Easiest route: class 5.9 A2+ climbing

Nagunt Mesa is a 7,785-foot (2,373 m) mountain summit located in the Kolob Canyons area of Zion National Park in Washington County, Utah, United States.

== Description ==
Its nearest higher neighbor is Timber Top Mountain, 1.3 mi (2.1 km) to the south, with Paria Point and Tucupit Point situated to the north. Walls of Jurassic Navajo sandstone encircle this mesa-like feature, ranging up to 1,400-ft high in places. Precipitation runoff from the mesa drains into Timber Creek, which is part of the Virgin River drainage basin. This feature's nagunt name is the Paiute word for "bighorn sheep".

== Climate ==
Spring and fall are the most favorable seasons to visit Nagunt Mesa. According to the Köppen climate classification system, it is located in a Cold semi-arid climate zone, which is defined by the coldest month having an average mean temperature below 32 °F (0 °C), and at least 50% of the total annual precipitation being received during the spring and summer. This desert climate receives less than 10 inches (250 millimeters) of annual rainfall, and snowfall is generally light during the winter.

== See also ==
- List of mountains in Utah
- Geology of the Zion and Kolob canyons area
- Colorado Plateau

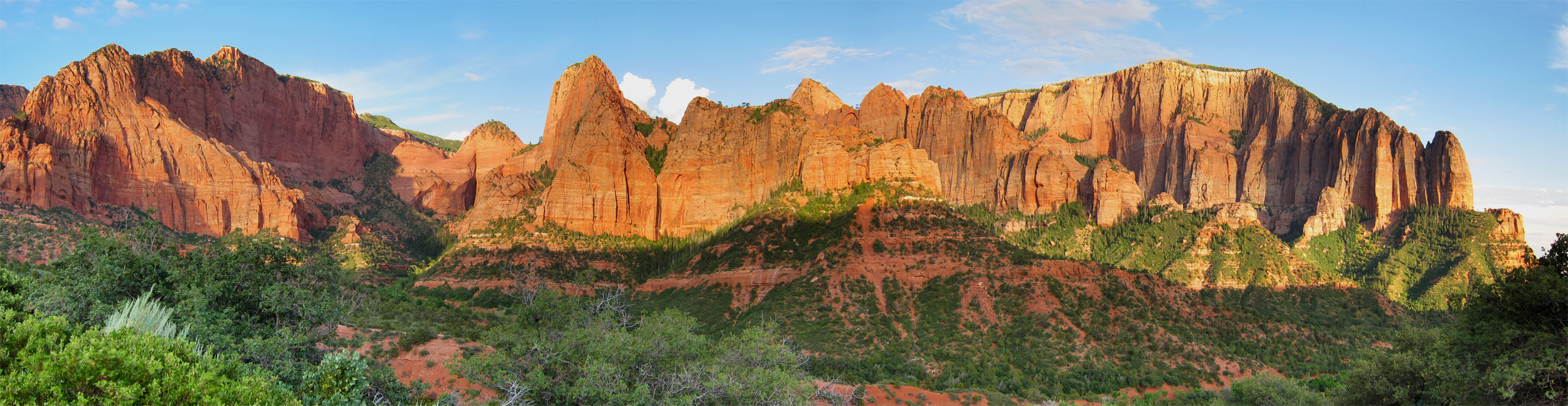
Kolob Canyons: Beatty Point (left), Nagunt Mesa (left of center), Timber Top Mountain (right)
