= Timber Top Mountain =

Summit in Zion National Park, Utah

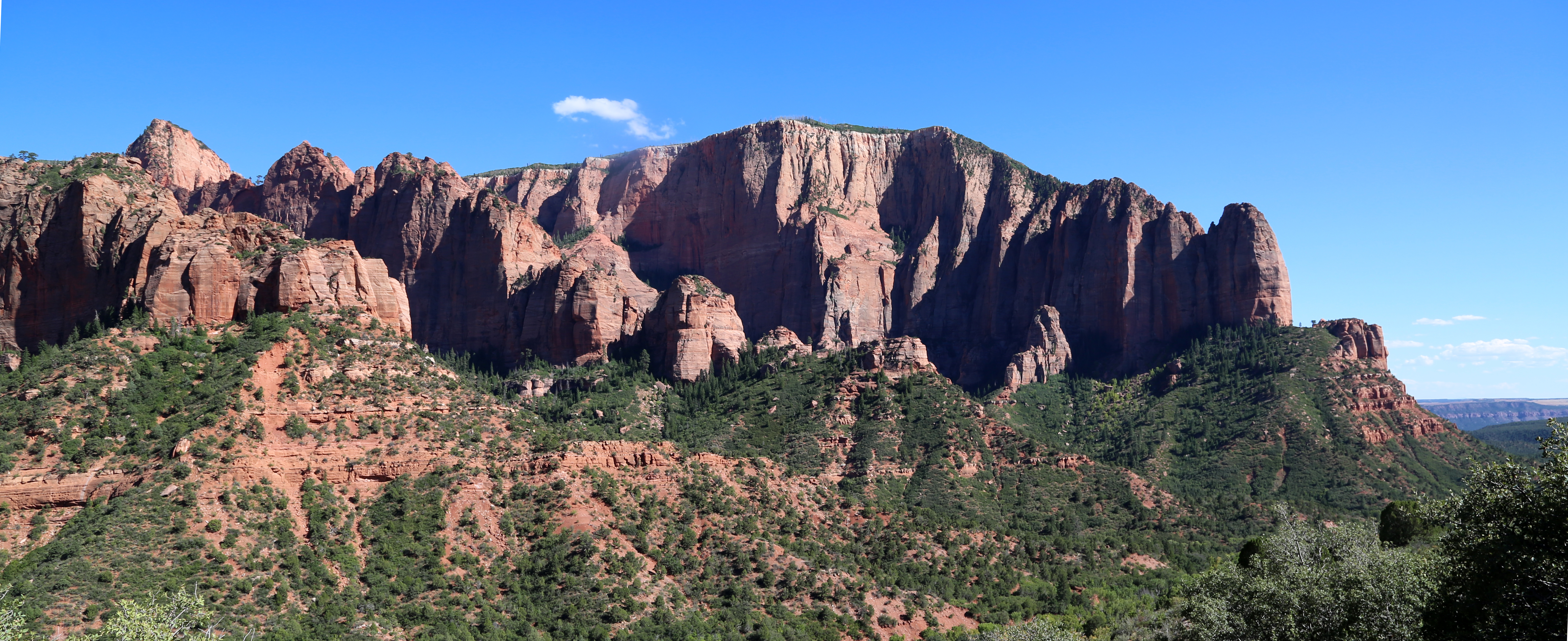
- Timber Top Mountain, northwest aspect

Highest point
- Elevation: 8,055 ft (2,455 m)
- Prominence: 1,335 ft (407 m)
- Parent peak: Horse Ranch Mountain (8,726 ft)
- Isolation: 3.91 mi (6.29 km)
- Coordinates: 37°25′26″N 113°10′45″W

Geography
- Location within Utah Location within the United States
- Country: United States
- State: Utah
- County: Washington
- Protected area: Zion National Park
- Parent range: Colorado Plateau
- Topo map: USGS Kolob Arch

Geology
- Rock age: Jurassic
- Rock type: Navajo sandstone

Climbing
- Easiest route: class 5.11d Climbing

Timber Top Mountain is an 8,055-foot (2,455 m) mountain summit located in the Kolob Canyons section of Zion National Park, in Washington County, Utah, United States. Its nearest higher neighbor is Horse Ranch Mountain, 3.9 mi (6.3 km) to the north-northeast, Nagunt Mesa is immediately north, and Tucupit Point is situated 2.8 mi (4.5 km) to the north. Timber Top Mountain is the second-highest peak in Zion Park, following only Horse Ranch Mountain. Walls of Navajo sandstone encircle this mesa-like feature, ranging from 400-ft high on along the south side, up to 2,000 feet on the north aspect. Kolob Arch is set on the lower southeast cliff of the mountain, and Shuntavi Butte forms the west tip of the mountain. Precipitation runoff from the mountain drains into Timber Creek, which is within the Virgin River drainage basin.

== See also ==
- Geology of the Zion and Kolob canyons area
- Colorado Plateau

== Gallery ==
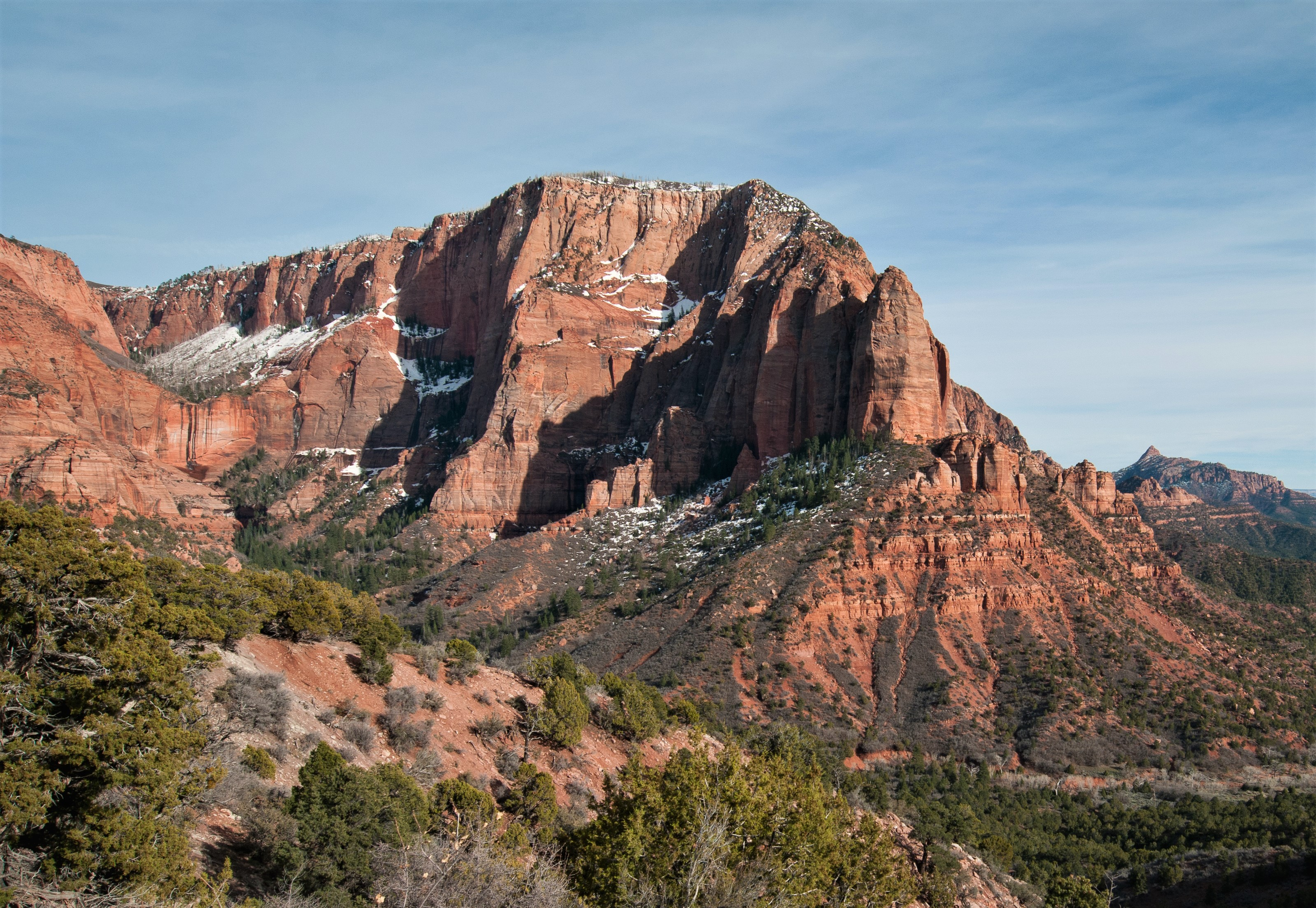
Timber Top Mountain with Shuntavi Butte

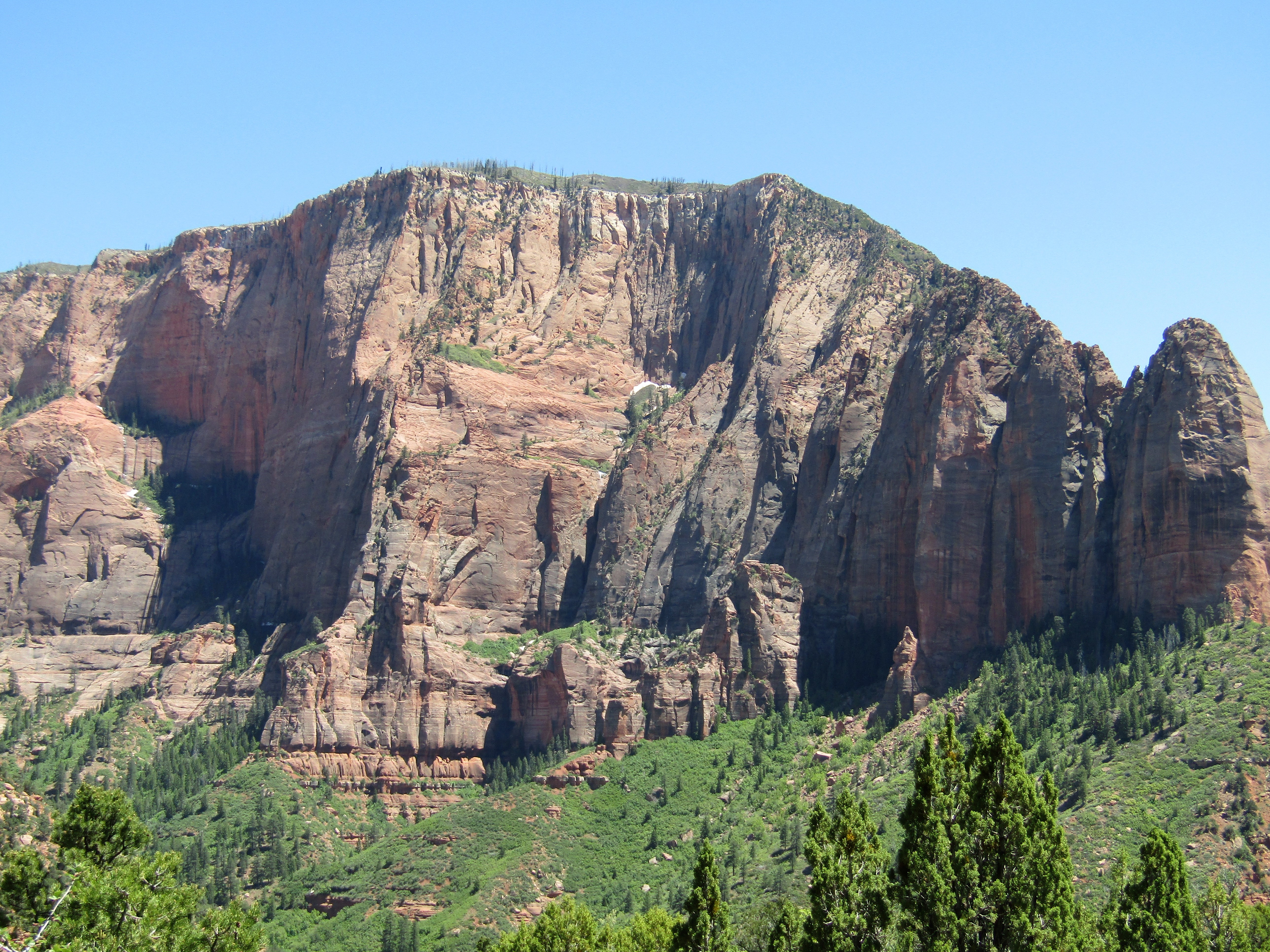
Timber Top Mountain, with Shuntavi Butte (7,080-ft) far right

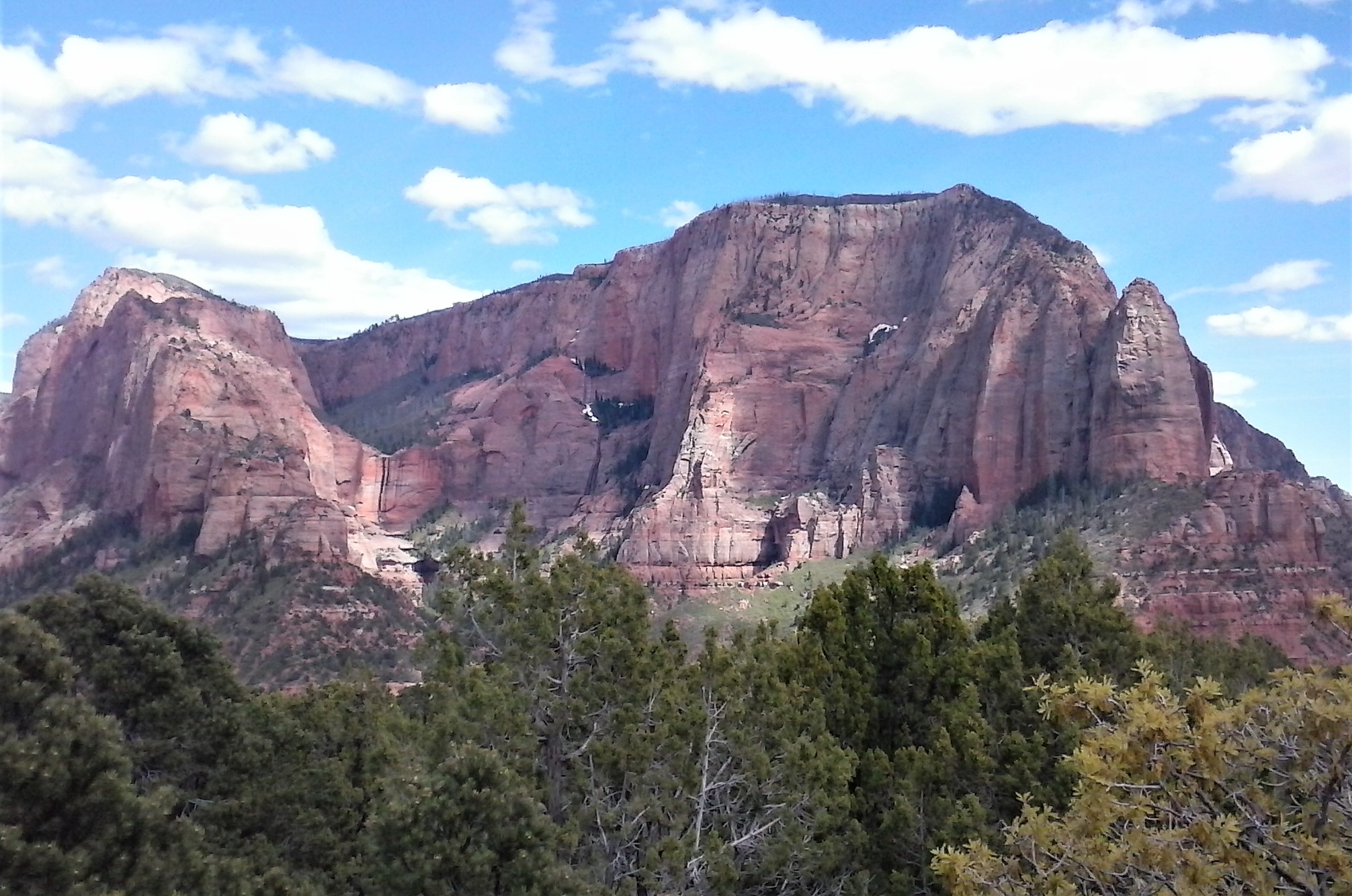
Timber Top Mtn

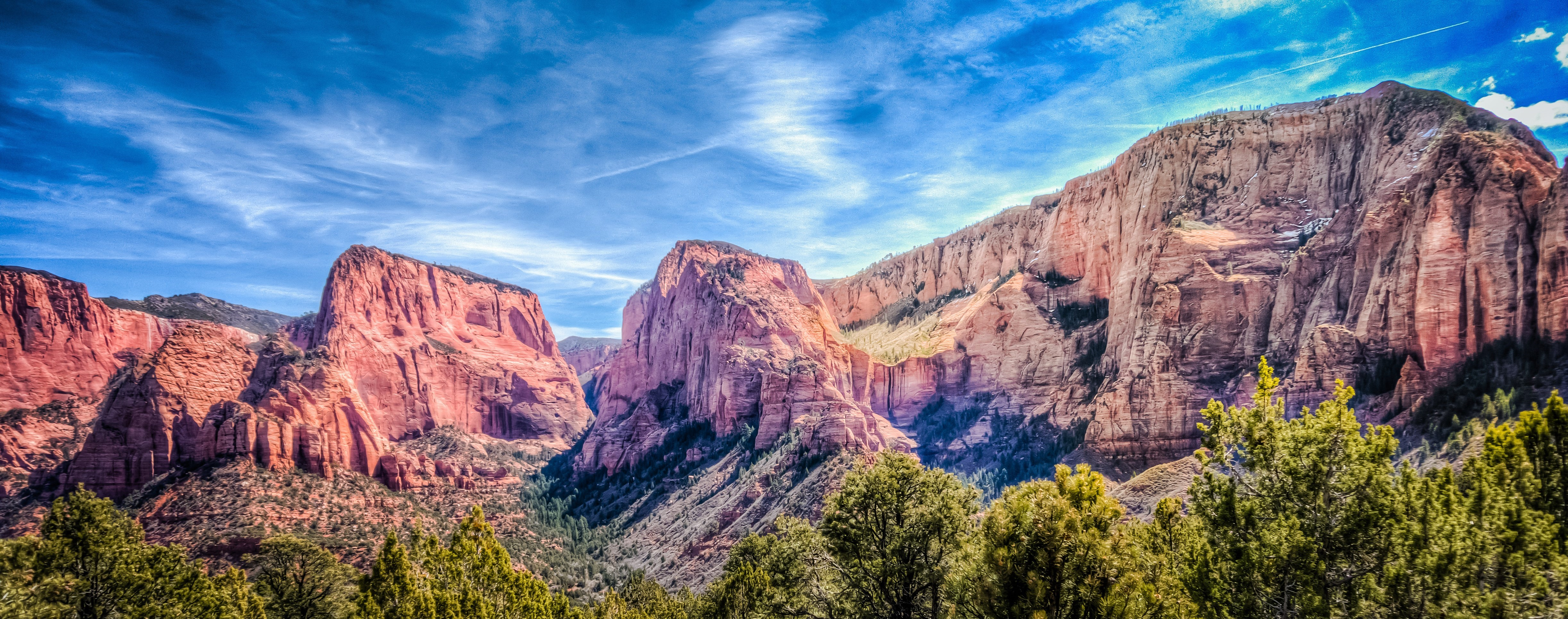
Nagunt Mesa (left), Timber Top (center and right)

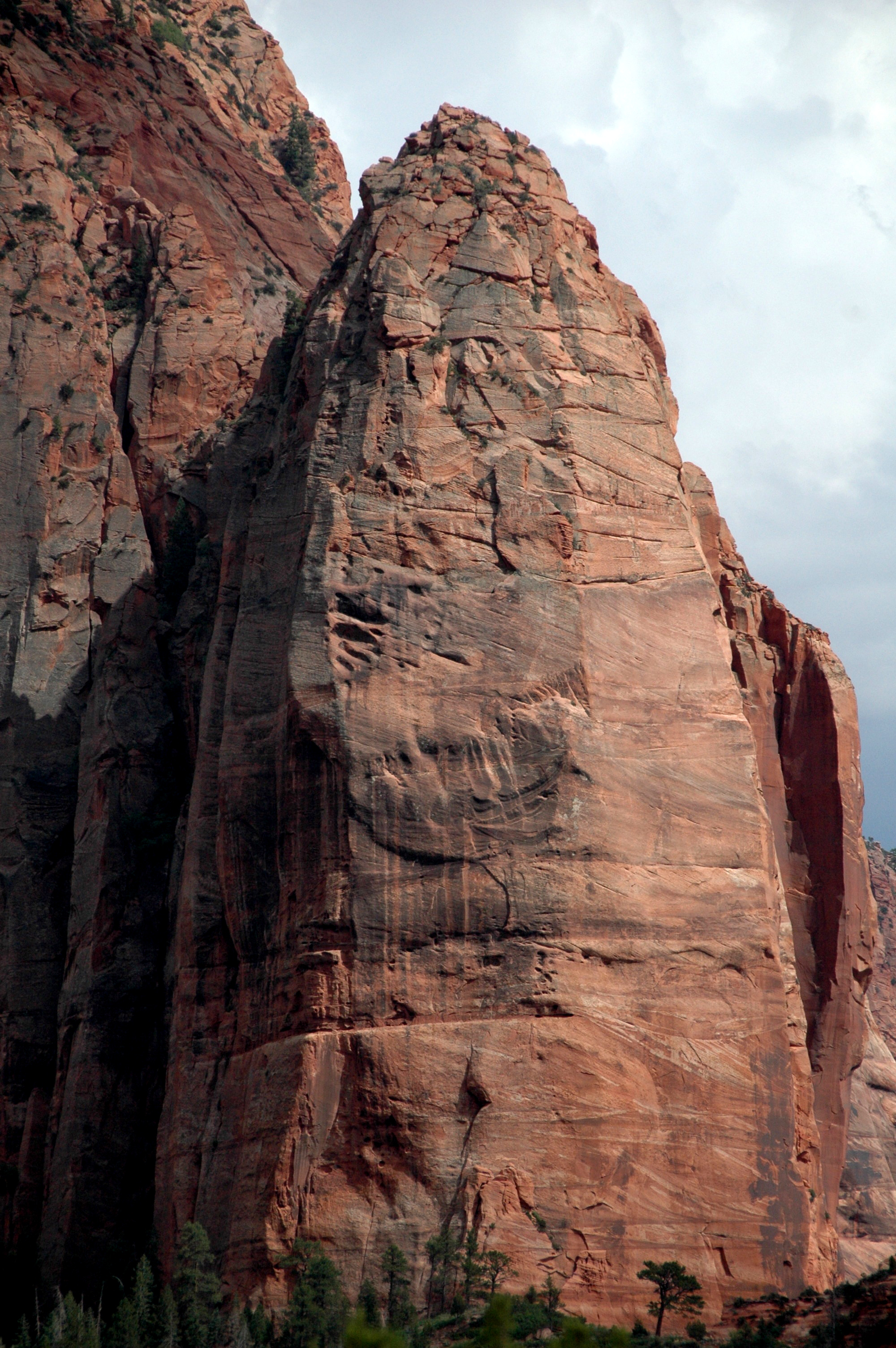
Shuntavi Butte

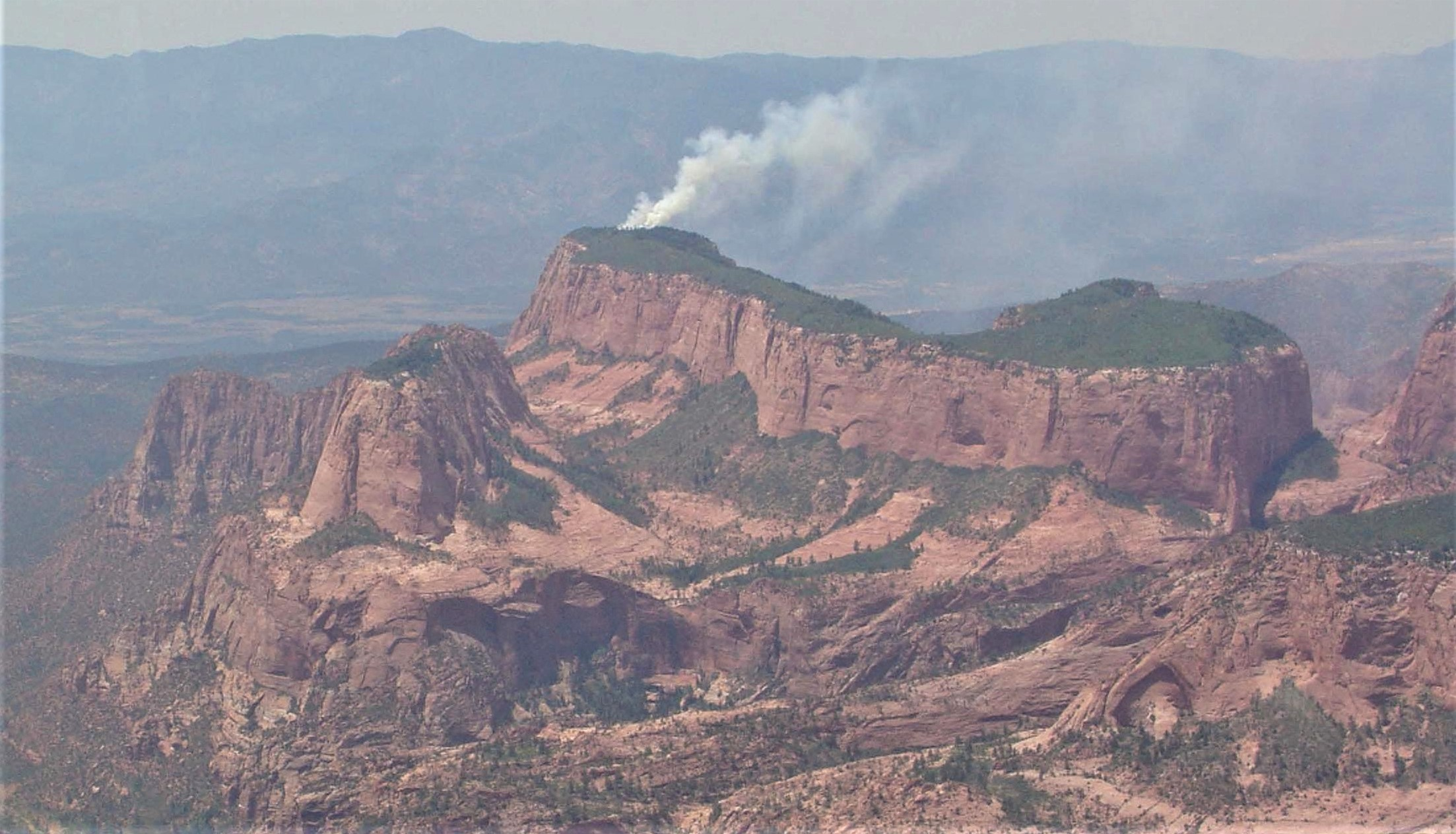
The July 2003 Timber Top Mountain fire was a lightning-ignited wildland fire that burned in mixed brush, fir and ponderosa pine
