= Colburn's Butte, South Utah =

Painting by Thomas Moran

- Artist: Thomas Moran
- Year: 1873
- Medium: Watercolor, gouache, and graphite on wove paper
- Subject: Tucupit Point, Kolob Canyons
- Dimensions: 35.2 cm × 24 cm (13.9 in × 9.4 in)
- Location: Metropolitan Museum of Art; New York
- Accession: 2009.547

Colburn's Butte, South Utah is a watercolor painting by the American artist Thomas Moran, created in 1873. Done in watercolor, gouache, and graphite on wove paper, the work depicts Tucupit Point (formerly Colburn's Butte) in the Kolob Canyons, Zion National Park.

== Description ==
Colburn's Butte was rendered by Moran after the artist viewed the Kolob Canyons on a trip from Salt Lake City to the north rim of the Grand Canyon. At the time, Moran was travelling to join an expedition of John Wesley Powell along the Colorado River. Moran's party passed a then unnamed pinnacle in July, with Moran choosing to render a watercolor drawing of the geographic feature. He would later give the watercolor to Justin Colburn, a correspondent for the New York Times travelling with Moran, for whom "Colburn's Butte" would later be named. Moran later made an engraving (heavily based on his watercolor) of the butte and published it in The Aldine.

In the watercolor, several peaks can be seen; the titular Colburn's Butte can be identified as the second from left peak with a white cloud behind it. Colburn's Butte would later be renamed Tucupit Point, and the landmark now falls within the borders of Zion National Park.

The watercolor was donated to the Met in 2009. (Note: Colburn's Butte, South Utah was gifted to the Met by David and Laura Grey in honor of Kevin J. Avery, who authored several influential books examining the Met’s watercolor collection)
