= Horse Ranch Mountain =

Mountain in south-west Utah

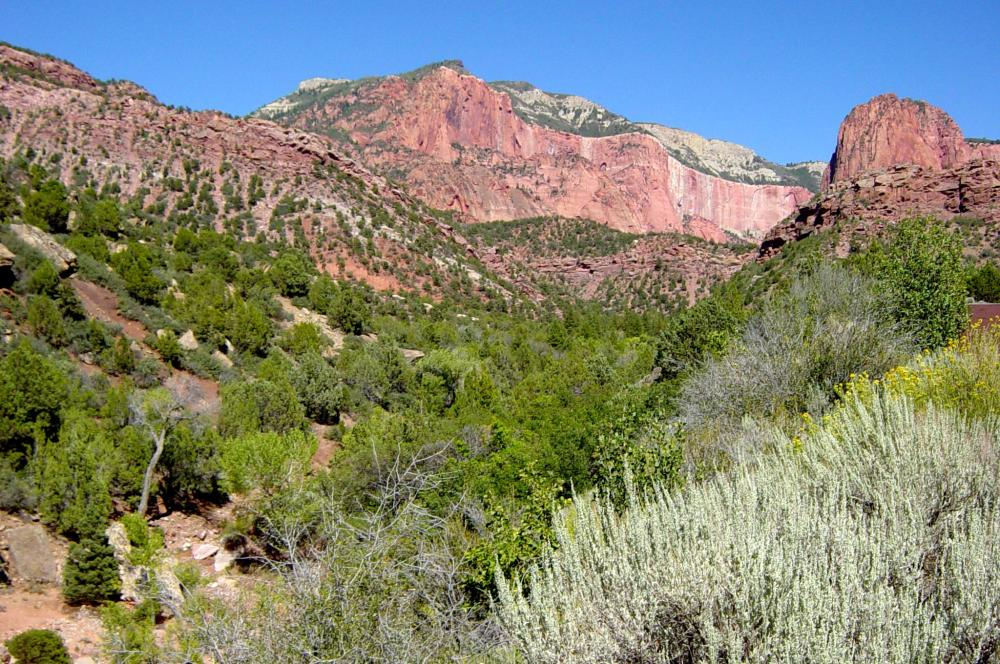
- Horse Ranch Mountain, as seen from the Taylor Creek area, August 2004

Highest point
- Elevation: 8,733 ft (2,662 m)
- Prominence: 966 feet (294 m)
- Coordinates: 37°28′40″N 113°9′30″W

Geography
- Location: Zion National Park in Washington County, Utah, United States
- Parent range: Colorado Plateau
- Topo map: USGS Kolob Arch

Horse Ranch Mountain is an 8,733-foot (2,662 m) mountain in the Kolob Canyons section of Zion National Park in northeastern Washington County, Utah, United States, that is the highest summit within the national park. It rises above Camp Creek to the north and Taylor Creek to the south. Its neighbors include Tucupit Point, 1 mi (1.6 km) to the south, and Timber Top Mountain is situated 3.9 mi (6.3 km) to the south-southwest.

== See also ==
- List of mountains in Utah
