= Geology of the Zion and Kolob canyons area =

Geology of Zion National Park in Utah

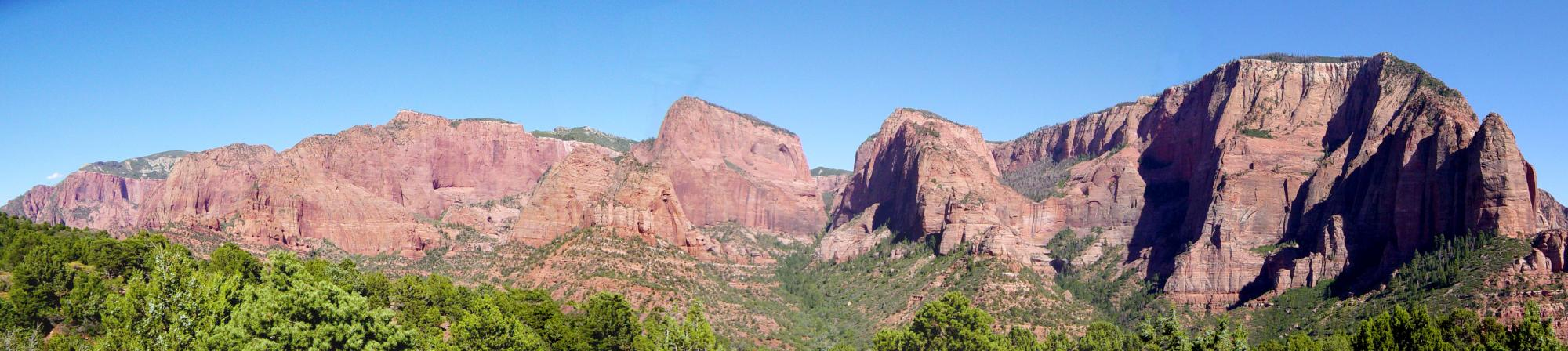
Kolob Canyons from the end of Kolob Canyons Road. Stream erosion has incised the Kolob Plateau to form canyons that expose the red-orange colored Navajo Sandstone and other formations.

The geology of the Zion and Kolob canyons area includes nine known exposed formations, all visible in Zion National Park in the U.S. state of Utah. Together, these formations represent about 150 million years of mostly Mesozoic-aged sedimentation in that part of North America. Part of a super-sequence of rock units called the Grand Staircase, the formations exposed in the Zion and Kolob area were deposited in several different environments that range from the warm shallow seas of the Kaibab and Moenkopi formations, streams and lakes of the Chinle, Moenave, and Kayenta formations to the large deserts of the Navajo and Temple Cap formations and dry near shore environments of the Carmel Formation.

Subsequent uplift of the Colorado Plateau slowly raised these formations much higher than where they were deposited. This steepened the stream gradient of the ancestral rivers and other streams on the plateau. The faster-moving streams took advantage of uplift-created joints in the rocks to remove all Cenozoic-aged formations and cut gorges into the plateaus. Zion Canyon was cut by the North Fork of the Virgin River in this way. Lava flows and cinder cones covered parts of the area during the later part of this process.

Zion National Park includes an elevated plateau that consists of sedimentary formations that dip very gently to the east. This means that the oldest strata are exposed along the Virgin River in the Zion Canyon part of the park, and the youngest are exposed in the Kolob Canyons section. The plateau is bounded on the east by the Sevier Fault Zone, and on the west by the Hurricane Fault Zone. Weathering and erosion along north-trending faults and fractures influence the formation of landscape features, such as canyons, in this region.

This geologic cross section shows the layering of the formations mentioned below

== Grand Staircase and basement rocks ==
The Grand Staircase is an immense sequence of sedimentary rock layers that stretch south from Bryce Canyon National Park through Zion National Park and into the Grand Canyon. Within this sequence, the oldest exposed formation in the Zion and Kolob canyons area is the youngest exposed formation in the Grand Canyon—the Kaibab limestone. Bryce Canyon to the northeast continues where the Zion and Kolob areas end by presenting Cenozoic-aged rocks. In fact, the youngest formation seen in the Zion and Kolob area is the oldest exposed formation in Bryce Canyon—the Dakota Sandstone.

In the Permian period, the Zion and Kolob area was a relatively flat basin near sea level on the western margin of the supercontinent Pangaea. Sediments from surrounding mountains added weight to the basin, keeping it at relatively the same elevation. These sediments later lithified (turned to rock) to form the Toroweap Formation, now exposed in the Grand Canyon to the south but not in the Zion and Kolob area. This formation is not exposed in the park, though it does form its basement rock.

== Deposition of sediments ==
=== Kaibab Limestone (Upper Permian) ===
In later Permian time, the Toroweap Basin was invaded by the warm, shallow edge of the vast Panthalassa ocean in what local geologists call the Kaibab Sea. At that time, Utah and Wyoming were near the equator on the western margin of the supercontinent Pangaea.

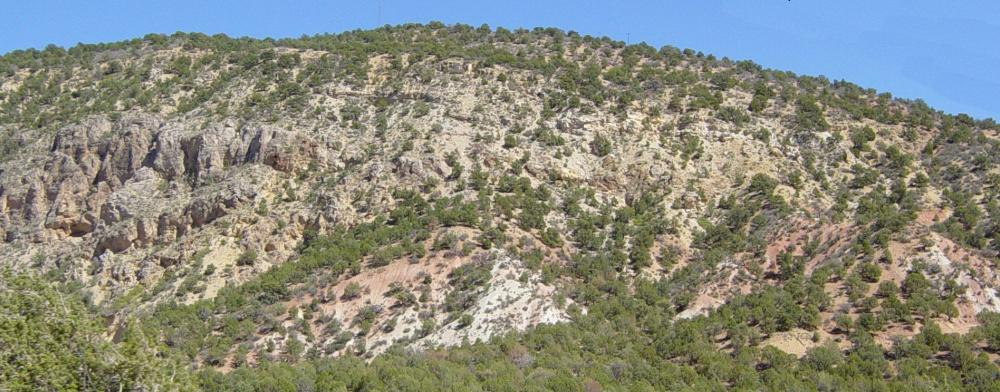
Hurricane Cliffs/Kaibab Formation

Starting 260 million years ago, the yellowish-gray limestone of the fossil-rich Kaibab Limestone was laid down as a limy ooze in a tropical climate. During this time, sponges, such as Actinocoelia meandrina, proliferated, only to be buried in lime mud and their internal silica needles (spicules) dissolved and recrystallized to form discontinuous layers of light-colored chert. In the park, this formation can be found in the Hurricane Cliffs above the Kolob Canyons Visitor Center and in an escarpment along Interstate 15 as it skirts the park. This is the same formation that rims the Grand Canyon to the south.

Farther to the west, a complex island arc assemblage formed above a subduction zone. To the east, in western Colorado, a mountain range similar to today's Himalayas called the Uncompahgre Mountains bordered the Utah lowland. The interfingering of the Kaibab with the White Rim Sandstone, now exposed in Capitol Reef National Park area, to the east suggests that the marine facies of the Kaibab migrated eastward in response to a relative sea-level rise, or transgression (the White Rim is not exposed in the Zion area). The sea moved back and forth across Utah, but by the Middle Permian, the sea had withdrawn and the Kaibab Limestone was exposed to erosion, creating karst topography and channels reaching 30 m (100 ft) in depth.

=== Moenkopi Formation (Lower Triassic) ===
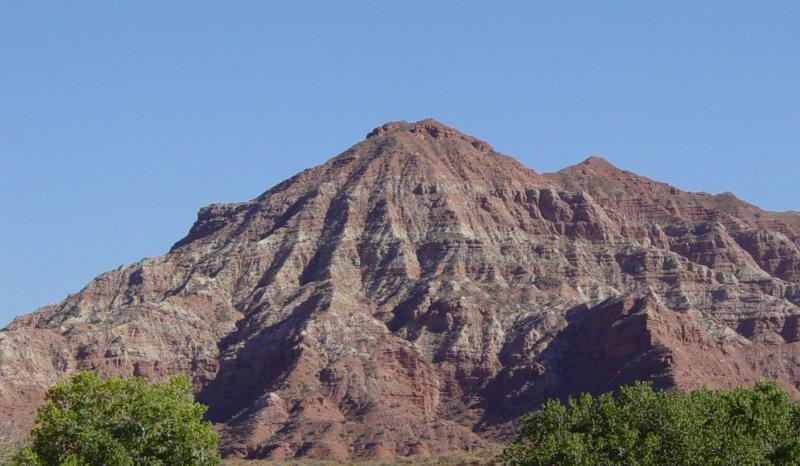
Moenkopi Formation

Volcanoes continued to erupt through the Early Triassic on the north–south trending island arc to the west, which was located along what is now the border between California and Nevada. Shallow, marine water stretched from eastern Utah to eastern Nevada over a beveled continental shelf. As the sea withdrew around 230 million years ago, fluvial, mudflat, sabkha, and shallow marine environments developed, depositing gypsum (from lagoon evaporites), mudstones, limestones, sandstones, shales, and siltstones.

It took many thousands of thin layers of these sediments to form the 1,800-foot (550 m) thick Moenkopi Formation. A prograding shoreline laid down muddy delta sediments which mixed with limy marine deposits. The fossilized plants and animals in the Moenkopi are evidence of a climate shift to a warm tropical setting that may have experienced monsoonal, wet-dry conditions.

The Red Canyon Conglomerate, the basal member of the Moenkopi, fills broad east-flowing paleochannels carved into the Kaibab Limestone. Some of these channels are up to several tens of feet deep and may reach 200 ft (61 m) deep in the St. George area. A thin, poorly developed soil, or regolith, formed over the paleotopographic high areas between the channels.

The depositional environment was a nearshore one where the seashore alternated between advance (transgression) and retreat (regression). At Zion, the limestones and fossils of the Timpoweap, Virgin Limestone, and Shnabkaib members of the Moenkopi Formation document transgressive episodes. Unlike the Timpoweap and Virgin Limestone members, the Shnabkaib contains abundant gypsum and interbedded mudstone resulting from deposition in a restricted marine environment with complex watertable fluctuations. Regressive, red bed layers separate the transgressive strata. Ripple marks, mud cracks, and thinly laminated bedding suggest that these intervening red shale and siltstone units were deposited in tidal flat and coastalplain environments.

Outcrops of this brightly colored red, brown, and pink banded formation can be seen in the Kolob Canyons section of the park and in buttes on either side of State Route 9 between Rockville, Utah, to the south and Virgin, Utah, to the southwest of the park borders. Progressively higher beds are exposed until the top of the formation is reached at the mouth of Parunweap Canyon (when traveling to the park on Route 9).

=== Chinle Formation (Upper Triassic) ===
Later, uplift exposed the Moenkopi Formation to erosion and Utah became part of a large interior basin drained by north and northwest-flowing rivers in the Upper Triassic. Shallow river deposition along with volcanic ash eventually became the mineral-rich Chinle Formation. The irregular contact zone, or unconformity, between the Chinle and the underlying Moenkopi can be seen between Rockville and Grafton in southwestern Utah.

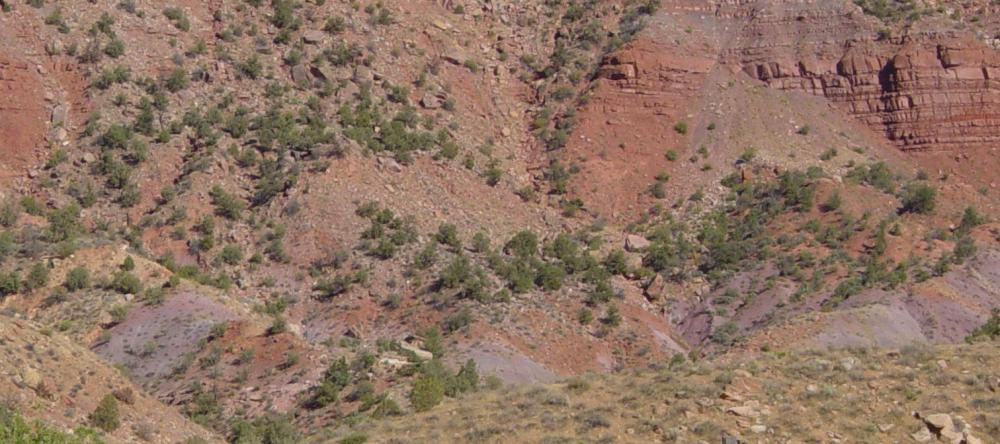
Chinle Formation

Petrified wood and fossils of animals adapted to swampy environments, such as phytosaurs, lungfish, and lacustrine bivalves, have been found in this formation as well as conifer trees, cycads, ferns, and horsetails. Relatively plentiful uranium ore, such as carnotite and other uranium-bearing minerals, has also been found. The purple, pink, blue, white, yellow, gray, and red colored Chinle also contains shale, gypsum, limestone, sandstone, and quartz. Iron, manganese oxides and copper sulfide are often found filling gaps between pebbles. Purplish slopes made of the Chinle can be seen above the town of Rockville.

The sand, gravel, and petrified wood which made up these deposits were later strongly cemented by dissolved silica (probably from volcanic ash from the west) in groundwater. Much of the bright coloration of the Chinle is due to soil formation during the Late Triassic. The lowermost member of the Chinle, the Shinarump, consists of a white, gray, and brown conglomerate made of coarse sandstone, and thin lenses of sandy mudstone, along with plentiful petrified wood. The Shinarump was laid down in braided streams that flowed through valleys eroded into the underlying Moenkopi Formation. This member of the Chinle forms prominent cliffs with thickness up to 200 feet (60 m), and its name comes from a Native American word meaning "wolf's rump" (a reference to the way this member erodes into gray, rounded hills).

A succession of volcanic-ash-rich mudstone and sandstone with a thickness of 350-foot (110 m) make up the Petrified Forest Member of the Chinle, which was deposited by lakes, highly sinuous rivers and on the surrounding floodplains. This is the same bright, multicolored part of the Chinle that is exposed in Petrified Forest National Park and the Painted Desert. Petrified wood is, of course, also common in this member.

=== Moenave and Kayenta formations (Lower Jurassic) ===
Early Jurassic uplift created an unconformity above the Chinle Formation that represents about ten million years of missing sedimentation between it and the next formation, the Moenave. Periodic incursions of shallow seas from the north during the Jurassic flooded parts of Wyoming, Montana, and a northeast–southwest trending trough on the Utah/Idaho border. The Moenave was deposited in a variety of river, lake, and flood-plain environments.

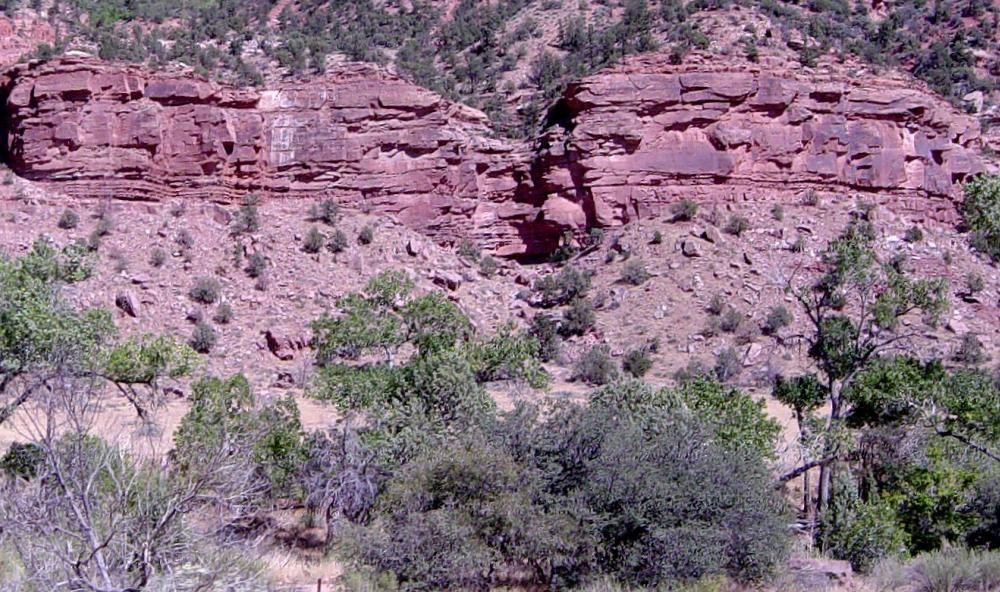
Moenave Formation

The oldest beds of this formation belong to the Dinosaur Canyon Member, a reddish, slope-forming rock layer with thin beds of siltstone that are interbedded with mudstone and fine sandstone. The Dinosaur Canyon, with a local thickness of 140 to 375 feet (43 to 114 m), was probably laid down in slow-moving streams, ponds and large lakes. Evidence for this is in cross-bedding of the sediments and large numbers of fish fossils.

The upper member of the Moenave is the pale reddish-brown with a thickness of 75 to 150 feet (23 to 46 m) and cliff-forming Springdale Sandstone. It was deposited in swifter, larger, and more voluminous streams than the older Dinosaur Canyon Member. Fossils of large sturgeon-like freshwater fish have been found in the beds of the Springdale Sandstone. The next member in the Moenave Formation is the thin-bedded Whitmore Point, which is made of mudstone and shale. The lower red cliffs visible from the Zion Human History Museum (until 2000 the Zion Canyon Visitor Center) are accessible examples of this formation.

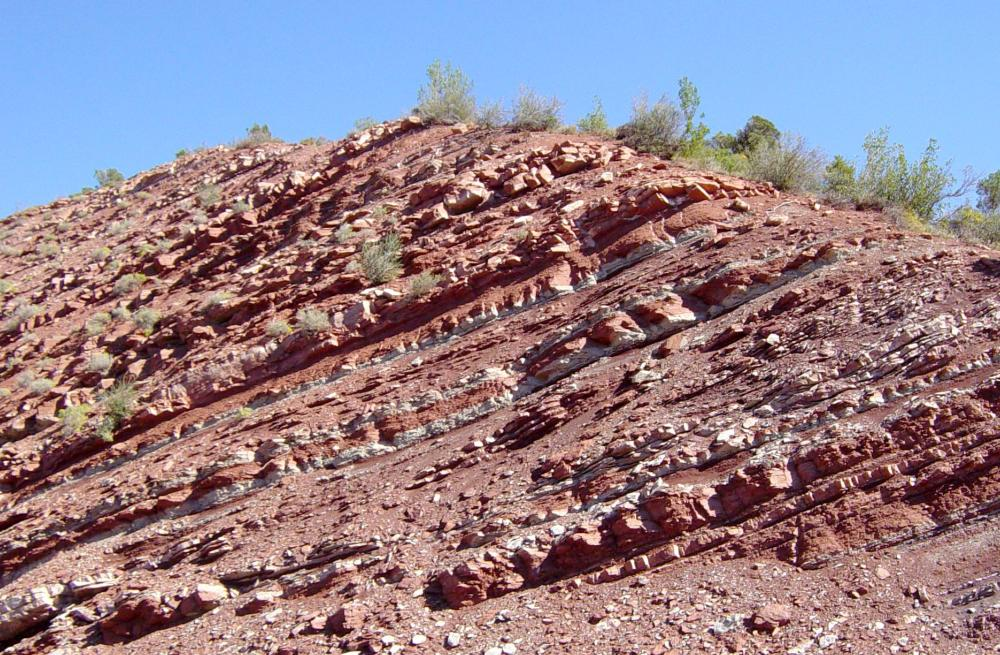
Kayenta Formation

At 200 to 600 feet (61 to 183 m) thick, the Kayenta Formation's sand and silt were laid down in early Jurassic time in slower-moving, intermittent streambeds in a semiarid to tropical environment. Interbedded sandstone, basal conglomerates, siltstones, mudstones, and thin cross-beds are typical channel and floodplain deposits found in the Kayenta. Paleocurrent studies show that the Kayenta rivers flowed in a general westward to southwestward direction.

Fossilized dinosaur footprints from sauropods have been found in this formation near the Left Fork of North Creek. Mountains in Nevada and California continued to rise in the Lower Jurassic as plate motions forced North America northward. Eventually, this created a rain shadow and brought widespread desertification. Today the Kayenta is a red and mauve rocky slope-former that can be seen throughout Zion Canyon.

=== Navajo Sandstone (Lower to Mid Jurassic) ===
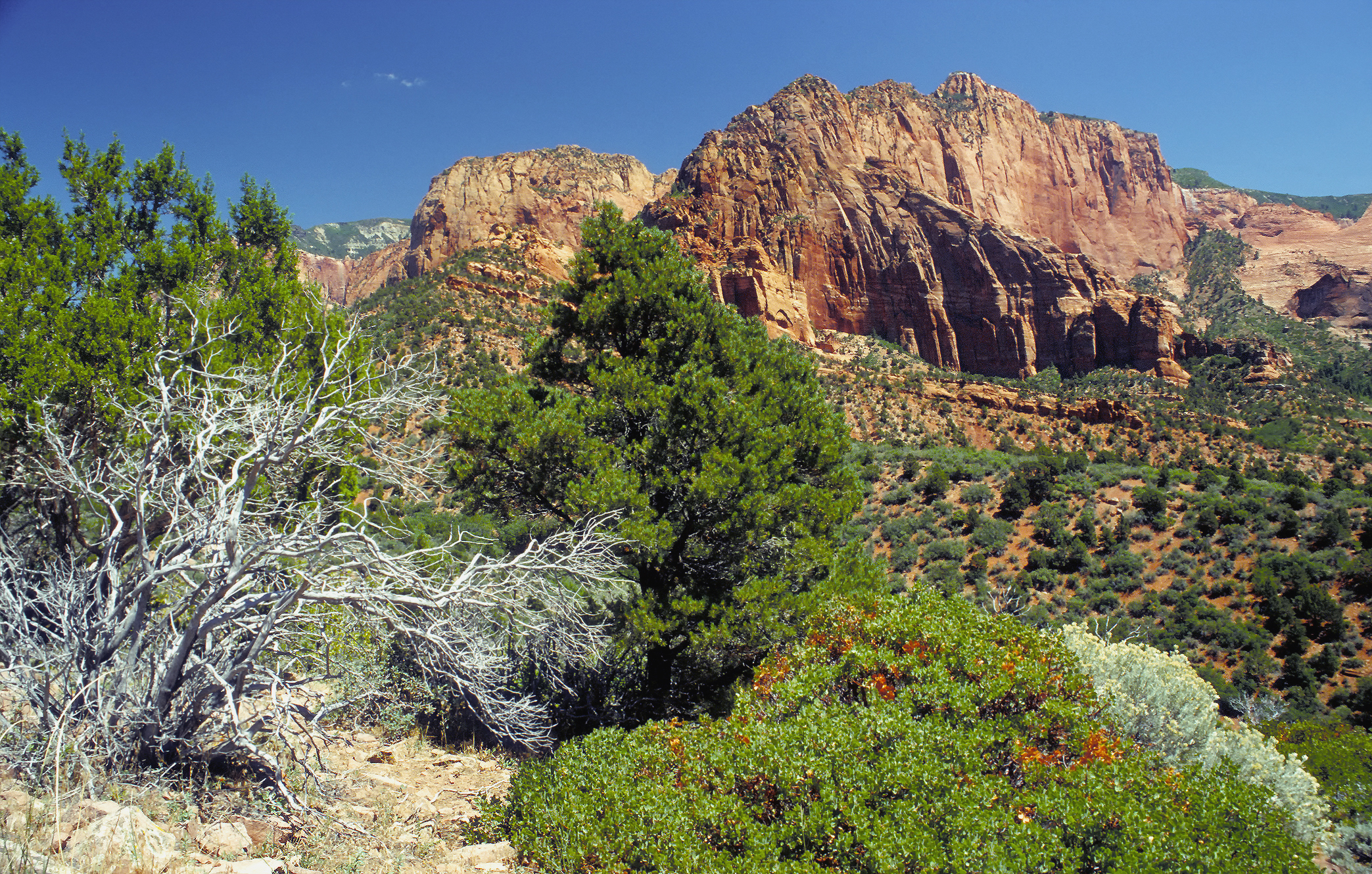
The reddish colored Navajo Formation in the Kolob Canyons. This part of Zion National Park is accessed by a park road about 20 miles south of Cedar City, Utah, off Interstate 15.

Approximately 190 to 136 million years ago in the Jurassic the Colorado Plateau area's climate increasingly became arid until 150,000 square miles (388,000 km^{2}) of western North America became a huge desert, not unlike the modern Sahara. For perhaps 10 million years sometime around 175 million years ago sand dunes accumulated, reaching their greatest thickness in the Zion Canyon area; about 2,200 feet (670 m) at the Temple of Sinawava (photo) in Zion Canyon.

Most of the sand, made of 98% translucent, rounded-grain quartz, was transported from coastal sand dunes to the west, in what is now central Nevada. Today the Navajo Sandstone is a geographically widespread, pale tan to red cliff and monolith former with very obvious sand dune cross-bedding patterns (photo). Typically the lower part of this remarkably homogeneous formation is reddish from iron oxide that percolated from the overlaying iron-rich Temple Cap formation while the upper part of the formation is a pale tan to nearly white color. The other component of the Navajo's weak cement matrix is calcium carbonate, but the resulting sandstone is friable (crumbles easily) and very porous. Cross-bedding is especially evident in the eastern part of the park where Jurassic wind directions changed often. The crosshatched appearance of Checkerboard Mesa is a good example (photo).

Springs, such as Weeping Rock (photo), form in canyon walls made of the porous Navajo Sandstone when water hits and is channeled by the underlying non-porous Kayenta Formation. The principal aquifer in the region is contained in Navajo Sandstone. Navajo is the most prominent formation exposed in Zion Canyon with the highest exposures being West Temple and Checkerboard Mesa. The monoliths in the sides of Zion Canyon are among the tallest sandstone cliffs in the world.

=== Temple Cap and Carmel formations (Middle Jurassic) ===
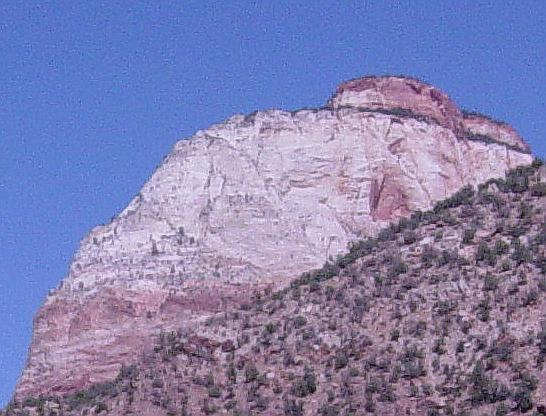
Temple Cap Formation atop a Navajo Sandstone monolith (aka The East Temple)

Utah and western Colorado were deformed as the rate of subduction off the west coast increased in the Middle Jurassic Sevier Orogeny. At the same time, an inland sea began to encroach on the continent from the north. Broad tidal flats and streams carrying iron oxide-rich mud formed on the margins of the shallow sea to the west, creating the Sinawava member of the Temple Cap Formation. Flat-bedded sandstones, siltstones, and limestones filled depressions left in the underlying eroded strata. Streams eroded the poorly cemented Navajo Sandstone, and water caused the sand to slump.

Desert conditions returned briefly, creating the White Throne member, but encroaching seas again beveled the coastline, forming a regional unconformity. Thin beds of clay and silt mark the end of this formation. The most prominent outcrops of this formation make up the capstone of The West Temple in Zion Canyon. Rain dissolves some of the iron oxide and thus streaks Zion's cliffs red (the red streak seen on the Altar of Sacrifice is a famous example). Temple Cap iron oxide is also the source of the red-orange color of much the lower half of the Navajo Formation.

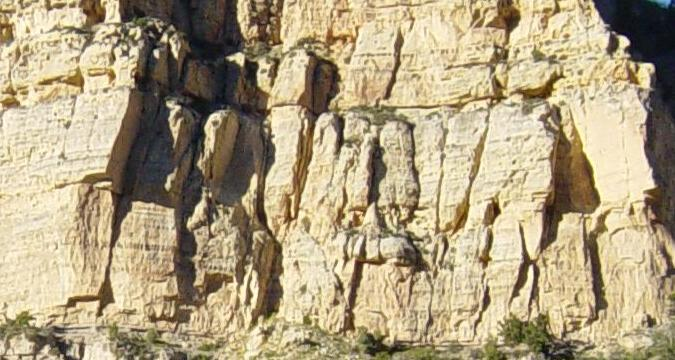
Carmel Formation

A warm, shallow inland sea started to advance into the region (transgress) 150 million years ago, finishing the job of flattening the sand dunes. Limy ooze with some sand and fossils were laid down as 1-to-4-foot (0.30 to 1.22 m) thick sedimentation beds from Mid to Late Jurassic time. Some calcareous silt percolated down into the buried sand dunes (carrying red oxides with it) and eventually cemented them into the sandstone of the Navajo Formation. The limy ooze above would later lithify into the hard and compact limestone of the Carmel Formation, 200 to 300 feet (61 to 91 m) thick.

Many unique environments were created by the migrating Sevier thrust system, and the four members of the Carmel Formation in southwest Utah capture these changing environments. Both open marine (crinoids) and restricted marine (pelecypods, gastropods) environments are represented in the Co-op Creek member. Sandstone and gypsum in the Crystal Creek and Paria River members signal a return to desert conditions in a coastal setting.

Outcrops of the Carmel Formation are most notably exposed on Horse Ranch Mountain (photo) in the Kolob Canyons section of the park and near Mt. Carmel Junction east of the park. Other formations totaling 2,800 feet (850 m) thick may have been deposited in the region during Late Jurassic and Early Cretaceous only to be uplifted and entirely removed by erosion.

=== Dakota Sandstone (Lower Cretaceous) ===
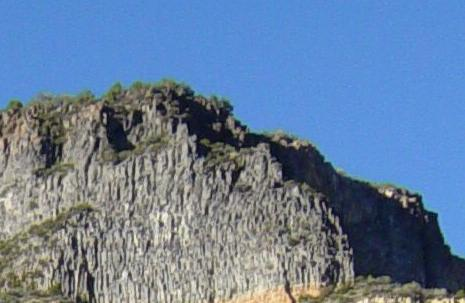
Dakota Sandstone

Mountains continued to rise in the Sevier orogenic belt to the west during the Cretaceous while the roughly north-south trending Western Interior Basin expanded. Rifting in the Gulf of Mexico helped the southern end of the basin to subside, which allowed marine water to advance northward. At the same time, the shoreline advanced inland from the Arctic region. The seas advanced and retreated many times during the Cretaceous until one of the most extensive interior seaways ever, called the Western Interior Seaway, drowned much of western North America from the Gulf of Mexico to the Arctic Ocean. The western shoreline of the seaway was in the vicinity of Cedar City, Utah, while the eastern margin was part of the low-lying, stable platform ramp in Nebraska and Kansas.

The pebble to cobble conglomerate and tan fossil-rich sandstone of the resulting 100-foot (30 m) thick Dakota Sandstone include alluvial fan and alluvial plain sediments that grade laterally into coastal plain, marginal marine, and marine deposits. A small remnant of the Dakota is exposed on top of the 8,766-foot (2,672 m) -high Horse Ranch Mountain (photo). This formation is the youngest one exposed in the Zion area but the oldest exposed in Bryce Canyon to the northeast. Deposition continued but the resulting formations were later uplifted and eroded away. The exposed formations in the Bryce Canyon area likely represent these lost layers.

== Tectonic activity and erosion ==
=== Regional forces ===
East–west-directed compression from subduction off the west coast affected the area in later Mesozoic and early Tertiary time by folding and thrust faulting strata. Evidence for the Sevier Orogeny part of this period can be seen in the Taylor Creek area in the Kolob section of the park. Chunks of Moenave strata have been compressed to the point of thrusting themselves over the same formation in the Taylor Creek Thrust Fault Zone, located on the east flank of the Kanarra anticline.

Tensional forces forming the Basin and Range physiogeographic province to the west about 20 to 25 million years ago in Tertiary time created the two faults that bound the Markagunt Plateau (which underlies the park): the Sevier Fault on the east and the Hurricane Fault on the west. The Hurricane fault zone is a major, active, steeply west-dipping normal fault that stretches at least 155 miles (250 km) from south of the Grand Canyon northward to Cedar City, Utah. Along the southern boundary of the park, tectonic displacement along this fault is about 3,600 ft (1,098 m). Several other normal faults also developed on the plateau.

Subsequent uplift of the Colorado Plateau and tilting of the Markagunt Plateau started 13 million years ago. This steepened the stream gradient of the ancestral Virgin River (Zion Canyon section of the park), and Taylor and La Verkin creeks (Kolob Canyons section of the park), causing them to flow and downcut faster into the underlying Markagunt Plateau. Downcutting continues to be especially rapid after heavy rainstorms and winter runoff when the water contains large amounts of suspended and abrasive sand grains. Uplift and downcutting are so fast that slot canyons (very narrow river-cut features with vertical walls), such as the Zion Narrows, formed.

=== Volcanic activity ===
Explosive andesitic volcanism dominated the area to the west of Zion during Oligocene and early Miocene time and probably inundated the region with hundreds of feet of welded tuff that has since eroded away. Three of these tuff layers are preserved on top of Brainhead Peak. About 21 million years ago the Pine Valley laccolith formed. This typical mushroom-shaped laccolith is one of the largest intrusions of this type in the world. Debris flows carried boulders of this intrusion onto the Upper Kolob Plateau indicating that the Hurricane Cliffs could not have been present at the time.

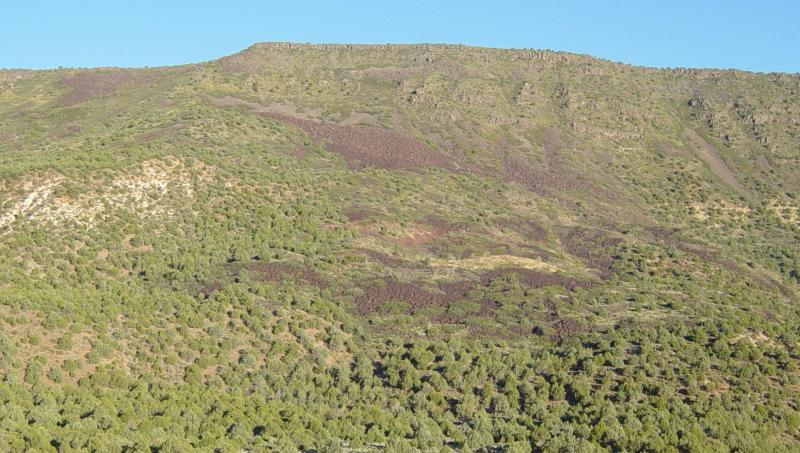
Basalt flows on Hurricane Cliffs

Then from at least 1.4 million to 250,000 years ago in Pleistocene time basaltic lava flowed intermittently in the area, taking advantage of uplift-created weaknesses in the Earth's crust. Volcanic activity was concentrated along the Hurricane Fault west of the park that today parallels Interstate 15. Evidence of the oldest flows can be seen at Lava Point and rocks from the youngest are found at the lower end of Cave Valley.> Some cinder cones were constructed much later in the southwest corner of the park.

Some of these lava flows blocked rivers and streams, impounding small lakes and ephemeral ponds in the process. About 100,000 years ago, basalt from the largest cinder cone in the park, Crater Hill, flowed over the area. The lava traveled into Coalpits and Scoggins Washes to the south and accumulated to a depth of over 400 ft (122 m) in the ancestral Virgin River valley near the present-day ghost town of Grafton, Utah. Water impounded behind the two blockages, forming Coalpits Lake and Lake Grafton respectively.

Lake Grafton was the largest of at least 14 lakes that have periodically formed in the park (most were from landslides; see below). Thirteen lava flows are mapped in and near Zion dating from 1.5 million to 100,000 years ago. More recent flows of less than 10,000 years in age occurred north of Zion and east of Cedar Breaks National Monument.

=== Erosion and canyon formation ===
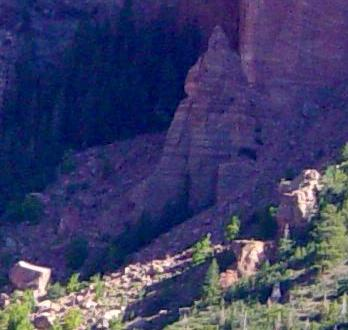
Rockslide debris in Kolob Canyons

Stream downcutting continued along with canyon-forming processes such as mass wasting; sediment-rich and abrasive flood stage waters would undermine cliffs until vertical slabs of rock sheared away. This process continues to be especially efficient with the vertically jointed Navajo Sandstone.

All erosion types took advantage of preexisting weaknesses in the rock such as rock type, amount of lithification, and the presence of cracks or joints in the rock. Basalt flows concentrated in valleys but subsequent erosion removed sedimentary rock that once stood at higher elevations. The resulting inverted relief consists of ridges capped by basalt which are separated by adjacent drainages.

In all about 6,000 feet (1,800 m) of sediment were removed from atop the youngest exposed formation in the park (the Late Cretaceous-aged Dakota Sandstone). The Virgin River carved out 1,300 feet (400 m) of sediment in about 1 million years. (Note: Corresponding to a rate of erosion of about 40 cm per 1,000 years (1.3 ft/1,000 yr)) This is a very high rate of downcutting, about the same rate as occurred in Grand Canyon during its most rapid period of erosion. About 1 million years ago, Zion Canyon was only about half as deep as it is today in the vicinity of Zion Lodge. Assuming that erosion was fairly constant over the past 2 million years, then the upper half of Zion Canyon was carved between about 1 and 2 million years ago and only the upper half of the Great White Throne was exposed 1 million years ago and The Narrows were yet to form.

Downcutting and canyon widening continue today as the process of erosion continues to try to reduce the topography to sea level. In 1998 a flash flood temporarily increased the Virgin River's flow rate from 200 to 4,500 ft^{3}/s (6 to 125 m^{3}/s). Geologists estimate that the Virgin River can cut another thousand feet (300 m) before it loses the ability to transport sediment to the Colorado River to the south. However, additional uplift will probably increase this figure.

=== Landslides and earthquakes ===
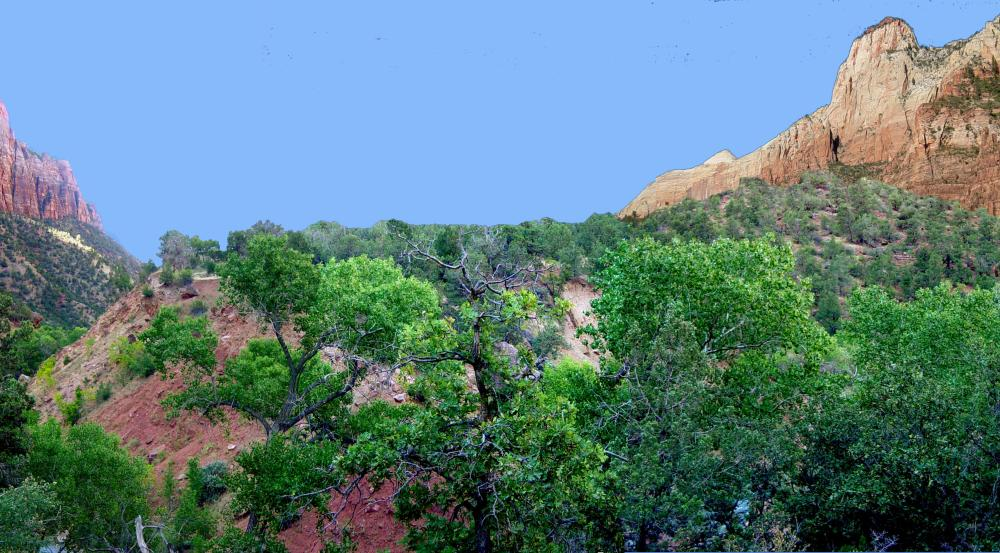
Sentinel Slide in Zion Canyon

Landslides more than once dammed the Virgin River and created lakes where sediment accumulated. Every time the river eventually breached the slide and drained the lake, leaving a flat-bottomed valley. About 7,000 years ago, the relatively thin wall between two closely spaced joints in the Navajo Sandstone collapsed. The resulting Sand Bench landslide blocked Zion Canyon just east of The Sentinel, creating Sentinel Lake. Another notable stand was created about 4,000 years ago when Sentinel Slide impounded the North Fork Virgin River, creating a lake that backed up to Weeping Rock. The current site of Zion Lodge was under about 200 feet (60 m) of water for around 700 years. Evidence of valley floors created by these lakes can be seen from Zion Canyon Scenic Drive south of Zion Lodge near Sentinel Slide. Recent landslides in 1923, 1941, and 1995 have temporarily dammed the Virgin River. Prior to the initial Sand Bench landslide, the Virgin River flowed 70 ft (21 m) lower in elevation than it does today.

The area is periodically rocked by mild to moderate earthquakes, which often trigger landslides. For example, on September 2, 1992, a Richter Magnitude 5.8 earthquake caused 14 million cubic meters (18 million cubic yards) of mostly Moenave Formation to slide downslope atop the weak claystone of the Petrified Forest member of the Chinle Formation. The quake was centered on the Washington Fault, about 30 miles (48 km) southwest. Three houses and two water tanks were destroyed when the slope they were built on dropped 98 feet (30 m) and extended laterally a similar distance over a period of several hours. The landslide is visible just outside the park's entrance in Springdale, Utah.

== Bibliography ==
- Biek, Robert F.; Grant C. Willis; Micheal D. Hylland; Hellmut H. Doelling (August 2003). "Geology of Zion National Park, Utah". In Paul B. Anderson (ed.). Geology of Utah's Parks and Monuments. Bryce Canyon Natural History Association and Utah Geological Association. ISBN 1-882054-10-5.
- GORP. "Zion National Park Geology". GORP / Orbitz Away LLC. Archived from the original on 2010-01-25.
- Graham, J. (2006). Zion National Park Geologic Resource Evaluation Report (PDF). Denver, Colorado: National Park Service. pp. 27–35. Natural Resource Report NPS/NRPC/GRD/NRR—2006/014. Archived from the original (PDF) on 2014-12-26. (public domain text)
- Harris, Ann G.; Tuttle, Esther; Tuttle, Sherwood D. (1997). Geology of National Parks (5th ed.). Iowa: Kendall/Hunt Publishing. pp. 30–42. ISBN 0-7872-5353-7.
- Leach, Nicky (2000). Zion National Park: Sanctuary in the Desert. Mariposa, California: Sierra Press.
- Tufts, Lorraine Salem (1998). Secrets in The Grand Canyon, Zion and Bryce Canyon National Parks (3rd ed.). North Palm Beach, Florida: National Photographic Collections. p. 43. ISBN 0-9620255-3-4.
- NPS. "Zion: Geologic Formations". National Park Service. (public domain text)
- NPS and ZNHA (Summer 2004). "The Geology of Zion". Zion Map and Guide. National Park Service and Zion Natural History Association.
