= Tucupit Point =

Mountain in Washington County, Utah, United States

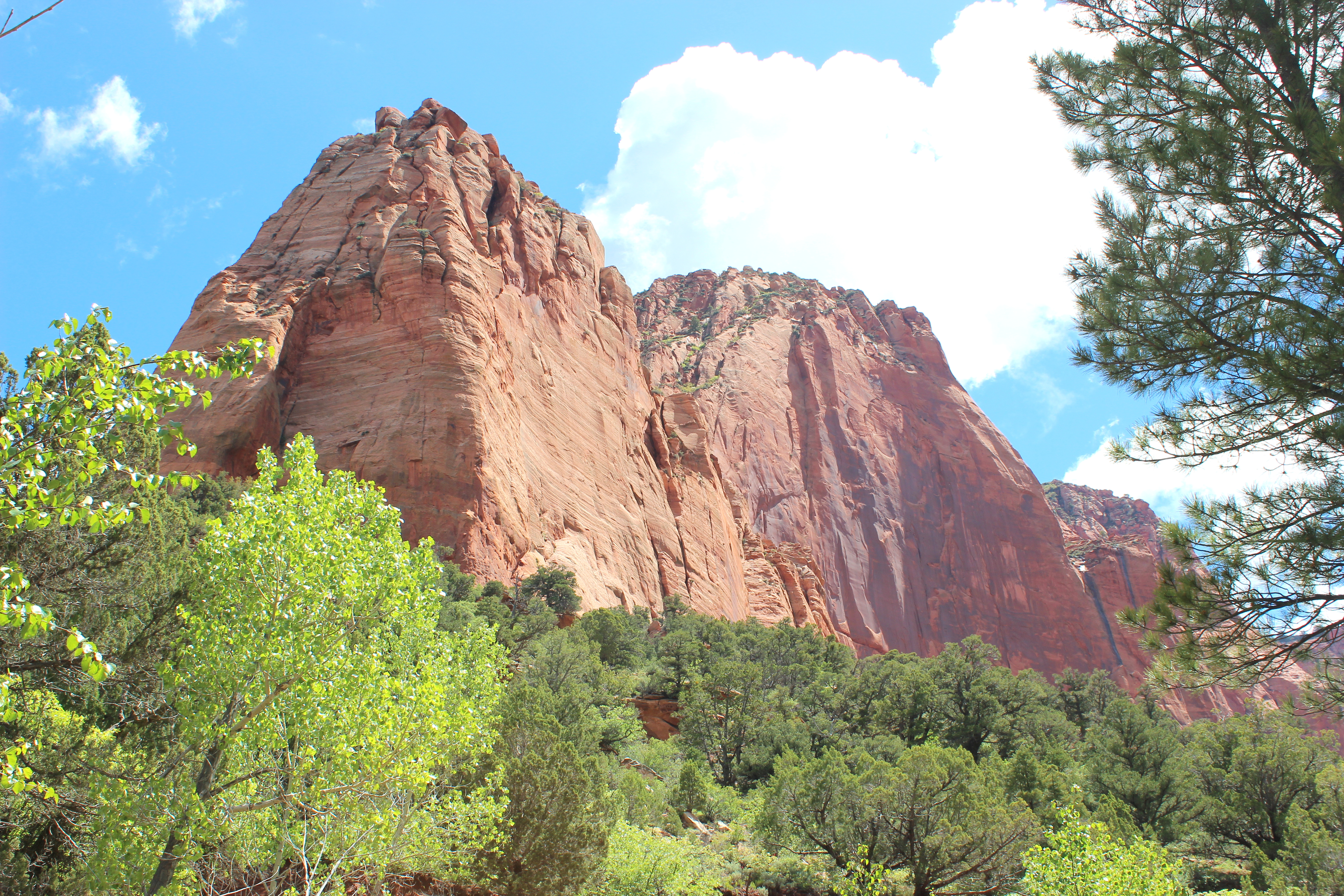
- Tucupit Point from Taylor Creek Trail, May 2015

Highest point
- Elevation: 7,698 ft (2,346 m) NAVD 88
- Prominence: 138 ft
- Coordinates: 37°27′46.8″N 113°10′25.8″W

Naming
- English translation: Wildcat
- Language of name: Ute-Southern Paiute

Geography
- Location within Utah
- Location: Washington County, Utah, U.S.

Tucupit Point is a prominent sandstone pinnacle in the Kolob Canyons area of Zion National Park in Washington County, Utah, United States.

== Description ==
The formation lays off of Taylor Creek Trail, and rises with a prominence of 138 feet. The pinnacle - visible from U.S. Route 40 to the west - has been the subject of numerous photographs. American artist Thomas Moran viewed the pinnacle in 1873 while travelling south from Salt Lake City, with the artist later rendering a famous watercolor of the feature. The pinnacle was then named "Colburn's Butte" after Justin Colburn, a correspondent for the New York Times travelling with Moran; it would later be renamed Tucupit Point, "Tucupit" being the Paiute word for wildcat.

== See also ==
- List of mountains in Utah
- Paria Point
- Beatty Point
