= National Register of Historic Places listings in Zion National Park =

This is a list of the National Register of Historic Places listings in Zion National Park.

This is intended to be a complete list of the properties and districts on the National Register of Historic Places (NRHP) in Zion National Park, Utah, United States. The locations of National Register properties and districts for which the latitude and longitude coordinates are included below, may be seen in an online map.

There are 29 properties and districts listed on the National Register in the park, 25 located within Washington County and three within Kane County. The latter three are structures at the East Entrance to the park. A small portion of the park extends north into Iron County but includes no National Register-listed places. The town closest by any practical route to all of these is Springdale, Utah. (See also National Register of Historic Places listings in Washington County, Utah and National Register of Historic Places listings in Kane County, Utah.)

This list is sorted alphabetically. Discussion of most of these, organized by type of property instead, is also provided in the following article: Historical buildings and structures of Zion National Park.

This National Park Service list is complete through NPS recent listings posted July 31, 2026.

== Current listings ==
	Name on the Register	Image	Date listed	Location	Description
1	Angels Landing Trail-West Rim Trail	Angels Landing Trail-West Rim Trail	February 14, 1987 (#86003707)	South of Scout Lookout across the Virgin River and Refrigerator Canyon; 37°16′06″N 112°56′58″W	
2	Cable Creek Bridge	Cable Creek Bridge	February 16, 1996 (#96000053)	Floor of the Valley Rd. at milepost 4.48, south of Weeping Rock Parking Area entrance 37°16′13″N 112°56′19″W	
3	Cable Mountain Draw Works	Cable Mountain Draw Works	May 24, 1978 (#78000281)	North of Springdale in Zion National Park; 37°15′57″N 112°55′59″W	
4	Canyon Overlook Trail	Canyon Overlook Trail	February 14, 1987 (#86003722)	Across the highway from the parking area at the eastern end of the Zion-Mt. Carmel Tunnel to a point directly above the Great Arch of Zion; 37°12′49″N 112°56′54″W	
5	Crawford Irrigation Canal	Crawford Irrigation Canal	July 7, 1987 (#86003732)	Western bank of the Virgin River from 1 mile (1.6 km) north of the Virgin River bridge to the base of the Virgin River Formation and .5 miles (0.80 km) up Oak Creek; 37°12′40″N 112°59′33″W	
6	East Entrance Checking Station	East Entrance Checking Station	February 14, 1987 (#86003711)	Island in middle of State Route 9; 37°14′01″N 112°52′06″W	Also included in National Register of Historic Places listings in Kane County, Utah
7	East Entrance Residence	East Entrance Residence	February 14, 1987 (#86003712)	Eastern entrance 150 feet north of State Route 9; 37°14′01″N 112°52′41″W	Also included in National Register of Historic Places listings in Kane County, Utah
8	East Entrance Sign	East Entrance Sign	July 7, 1987 (#86003710)	East Entrance Checking Station on northern and southern sides of State Route 9; 37°14′07″N 112°52′07″W	Also included in National Register of Historic Places listings in Kane County, Utah
9	East Rim Trail	East Rim Trail	July 7, 1987 (#86003723)	Between Weeping Rock Parking Area and Observation Point; 37°16′42″N 112°55′45″W	
10	Emerald Pools Trail	Emerald Pools Trail	February 14, 1987 (#86003725)	Footbridge across the highway from Utah Parks Lodge proceeding west to the Lower Emerald Pool; 37°14′58″N 112°57′16″W	
11	Flanigan Ditch	Flanigan Ditch	January 12, 1998 (#97001630)	Zion National Park; 37°12′53″N 112°58′28″W	
12	Floor of the Valley Road	Floor of the Valley Road	February 16, 1996 (#96000048)	From its junction with the Zion-Mt. Carmel Highway along the North Fork of the Virgin River in Zion National Park; 37°15′20″N 112°57′17″W	
13	Gateway to the Narrows Trail	Gateway to the Narrows Trail	July 7, 1987 (#86003726)	Temple of Sinawava at the end of Zion Canyon Scenic Dr. to a point 1 mile north on the Virgin River; 37°17′48″N 112°56′42″W	
14	Grotto Camping Ground North Comfort Station	Grotto Camping Ground North Comfort Station	February 14, 1987 (#86003705)	Grotto Picnic Area near Grotto Residence, east of Scenic Dr. 37°15′33″N 112°56′33″W	
15	Grotto Camping Ground South Comfort Station	Grotto Camping Ground South Comfort Station	February 14, 1987 (#86003704)	Grotto Picnic Area near Grotto Residence, east of Scenic Dr. 37°15′31″N 112°56′27″W	
16	Grotto Trail	Grotto Trail	February 14, 1996 (#86003914)	Zion National Park, 120 feet north of Zion Lodge extending south 0.2 miles parallel to the eastern side of Zion Canyon Scenic Dr. 37°15′01″N 112°57′26″W	
17	Hidden Canyon Trail	Hidden Canyon Trail	February 14, 1987 (#86003731)	Hidden Canyon junction on the East Rim Trail to the mouth of Hidden Canyon; 37°16′01″N 112°55′50″W	
18	Museum-Grotto Residence	Museum-Grotto Residence	February 14, 1987 (#86003721)	Southeast of Grotto Picnic Area; 37°15′28″N 112°57′03″W	
19	Oak Creek Historical District	Oak Creek Historical District	July 7, 1987 (#86003706)	Off State Route 9 along bank of Oak Creek; 37°12′40″N 112°59′10″W	
20	Oak Creek Irrigation Canal	Oak Creek Irrigation Canal	July 7, 1987 (#86003738)	Western side of the North Fork of the Virgin River, 1/8 miles north of the Virgin River Bridge to the northern side of Watchman Campground Entrance Rd. 37°12′09″N 112°59′28″W	
21	Parunuweap Canyon Archeological District	Parunuweap Canyon Archeological District	November 7, 1996 (#96001235)	Address Restricted	
22	Pine Creek Irrigation Canal	Pine Creek Irrigation Canal	July 7, 1987 (#86003734)	Eastern bank of the Virgin River 0.25 miles north of the Virgin River bridge to the southwestern end of the Watchman Residential Loop; 37°12′06″N 112°58′40″W	
23	Pine Creek Residential Historic District	Pine Creek Residential Historic District	July 7, 1987 (#86003736)	Western side of State Route 9 500 feet south of the bridge over the Virgin River; 37°12′59″N 112°58′32″W	
24	South Campground Amphitheater	South Campground Amphitheater	February 14, 1987 (#86003717)	South Campground; 37°12′12″N 112°58′55″W	
25	South Campground Comfort Station	South Campground Comfort Station	February 14, 1987 (#86003708)	South Campground at the northern end of the campsite loop 37°12′14″N 112°58′21″W	
26	South Entrance Sign	South Entrance Sign	February 14, 1987 (#86003713)	South Entrance; 37°12′04″N 112°59′22″W	
27	Zion Lodge Historic District	Zion Lodge Historic District	August 24, 1982 (#82001718)	North of Springdale in Zion National Park; also west of State Route 9 on the eastern and western sides of The Zion Canyon Scenic Drive near Birch Creek; 37°15′01″N 112°57′17″W	Second set of boundaries represents a boundary increase
28	Zion Nature Center-Zion Inn	Zion Nature Center-Zion Inn	February 14, 1987 (#86003719)	North of South Campground facilities 37°12′21″N 112°58′25″W	
29	Zion – Mount Carmel Highway	Zion – Mount Carmel Highway	July 7, 1987 (#86003709)	Along Utah State Route 9 between Springdale and Mount Carmel Junction; 37°13′19″N 112°55′58″W	Also included in the National Register of Historic Places listings in Kane County, Utah and National Register of Historic Places listings in Washington County, Utah

== See also ==
- National Register of Historic Places listings in Washington County, Utah
- National Register of Historic Places listings in Kane County, Utah
- List of National Historic Landmarks in Utah
- National Register of Historic Places listings in Utah
