= Cathedral Mountain (Zion National Park) =

Mountain in Utah, US

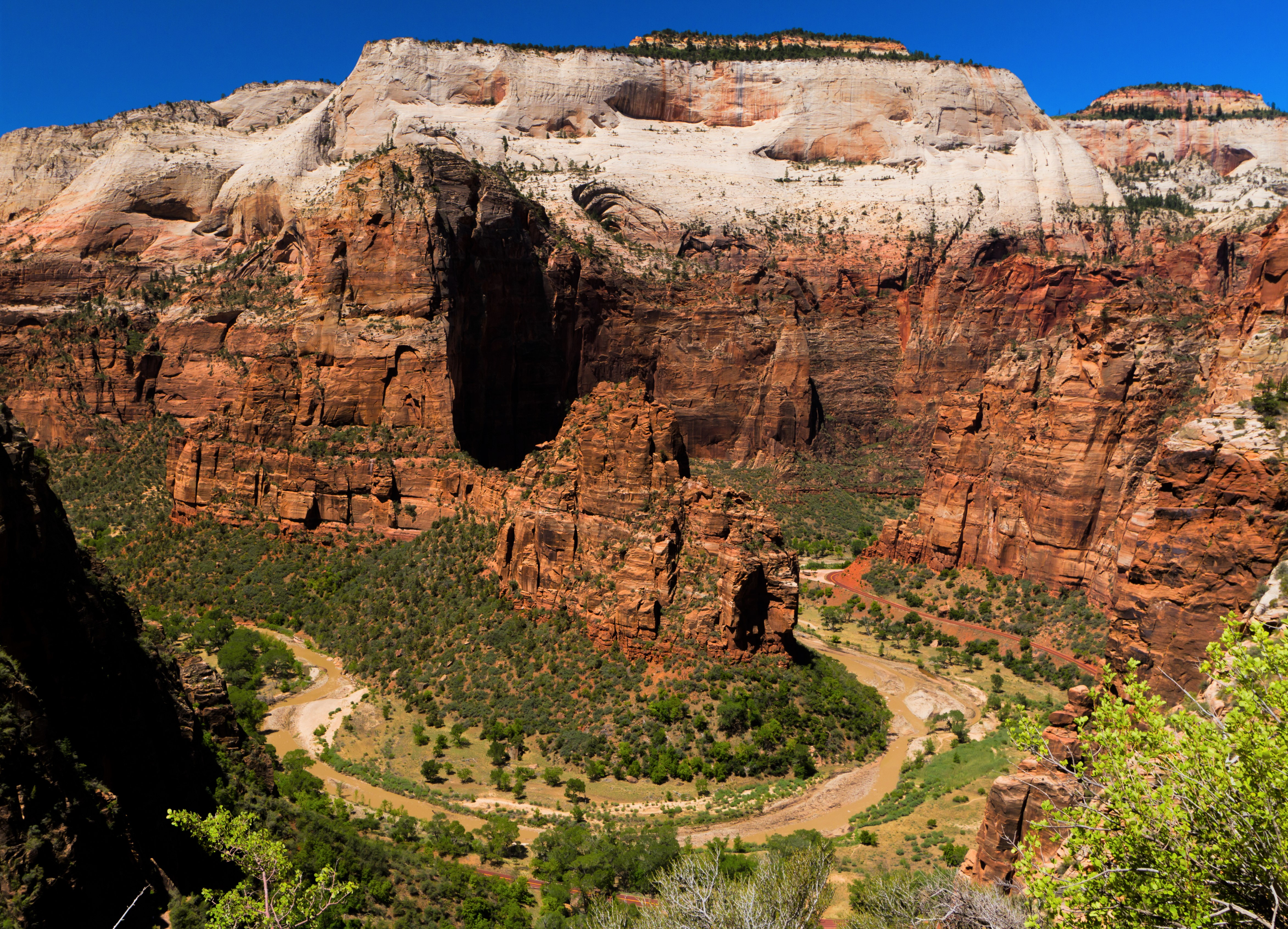
- Cathedral Mountain, east aspect, August 2012

Highest point
- Elevation: 6,930 ft (2,110 m)
- Prominence: 210 ft (64 m)
- Parent peak: Mount Majestic (6,956 ft)
- Isolation: 0.25 mi (0.40 km)
- Coordinates: 37°16′30″N 112°57′29″W

Geography
- Location within Utah Location within the United States
- Country: United States
- State: Utah
- County: Washington
- Protected area: Zion National Park
- Parent range: Colorado Plateau
- Topo map: USGS Temple of Sinawava

Geology
- Rock age: Jurassic
- Rock type: Navajo sandstone

Climbing
- First ascent: 1931
- Easiest route: class 4 scrambling

Cathedral Mountain is a 6,930-foot (2,110 m) elevation Navajo Sandstone summit located in Zion National Park, in Washington County of southwest Utah, United States.

== Description ==
Cathedral Mountain is situated at the north end of Zion Canyon, towering 2,500 feet (760 meters) above the canyon floor and the North Fork of the Virgin River which drains precipitation runoff from this mountain. Cathedral is the nearest higher neighbor to Angels Landing, with 0.7 miles (1.1 km) of separation, and the Angels Landing Trail traverses Refrigerator Canyon between them. Other neighbors include The Great White Throne, Observation Point, The Organ, Lady Mountain, Cable Mountain, and parent Mount Majestic. This feature's descriptive name was applied by Stephen S. Johnson in 1922, and officially adopted in 1934 by the U.S. Board on Geographic Names. The Spearhead, elevation 5,804-ft, is the southernmost tip of this mountain, and is prominently featured from Zion Lodge. The first ascent of Cathedral was made by Walter Becker, Fritz Becker, and Rudolph Weidner on August 31, 1931.

== Climate ==
Spring and fall are the most favorable seasons to visit Cathedral Mountain. According to the Köppen climate classification system, it is located in a Cold semi-arid climate zone, which is defined by the coldest month having an average mean temperature below 32 °F (0 °C), and at least 50% of the total annual precipitation being received during the spring and summer. This desert climate receives less than 10 inches (250 millimeters) of annual rainfall, and snowfall is generally light during the winter.

== Gallery ==
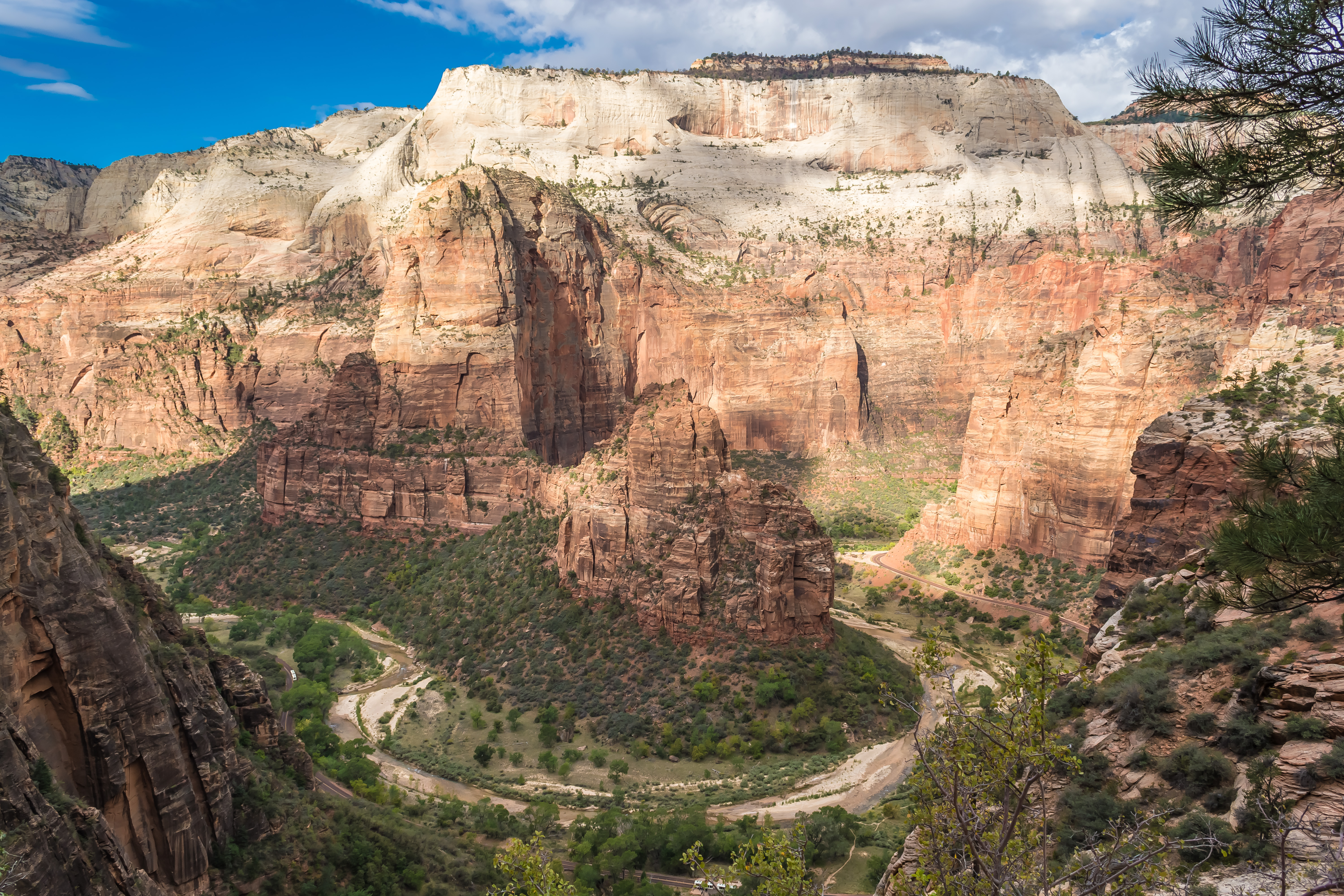
Cathedral centered beyond Big Bend

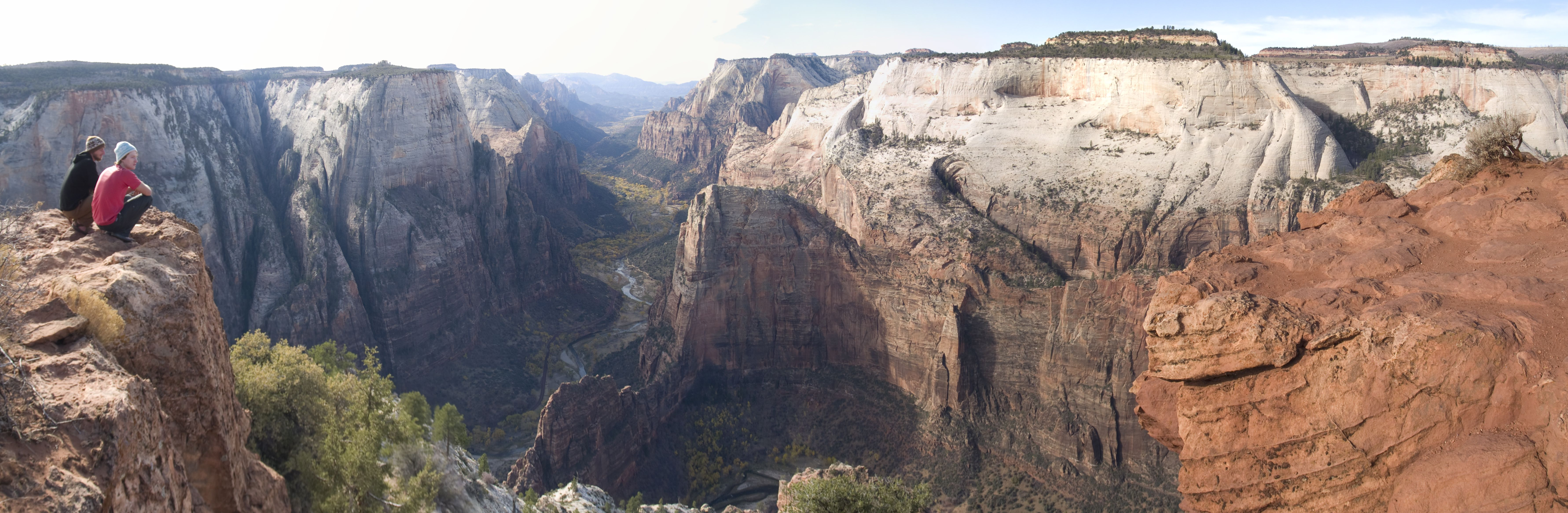
Enjoying the view from Observation Point, white cliffs of Cathedral Mountain to right

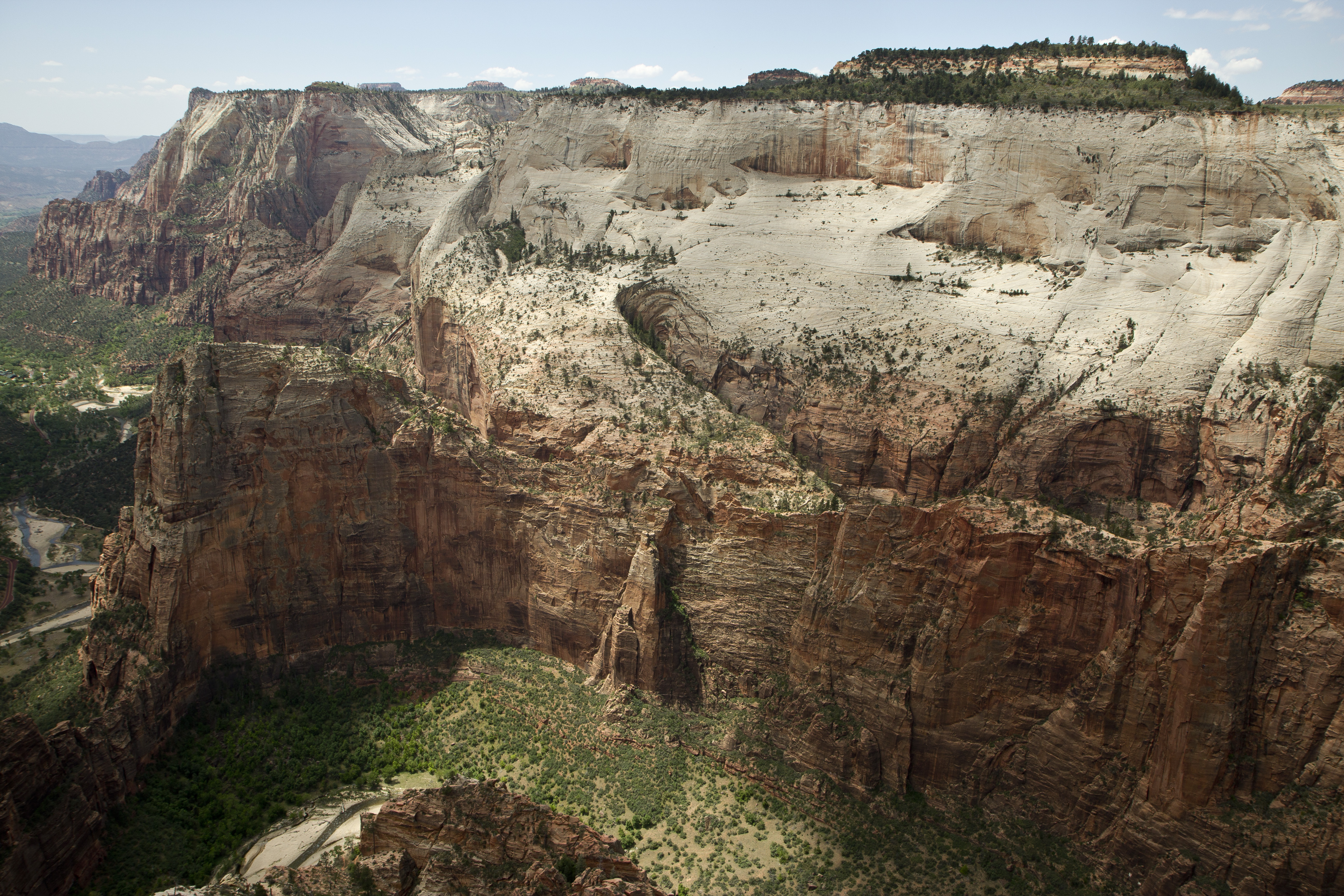
Cathedral Mountain from Observation Point

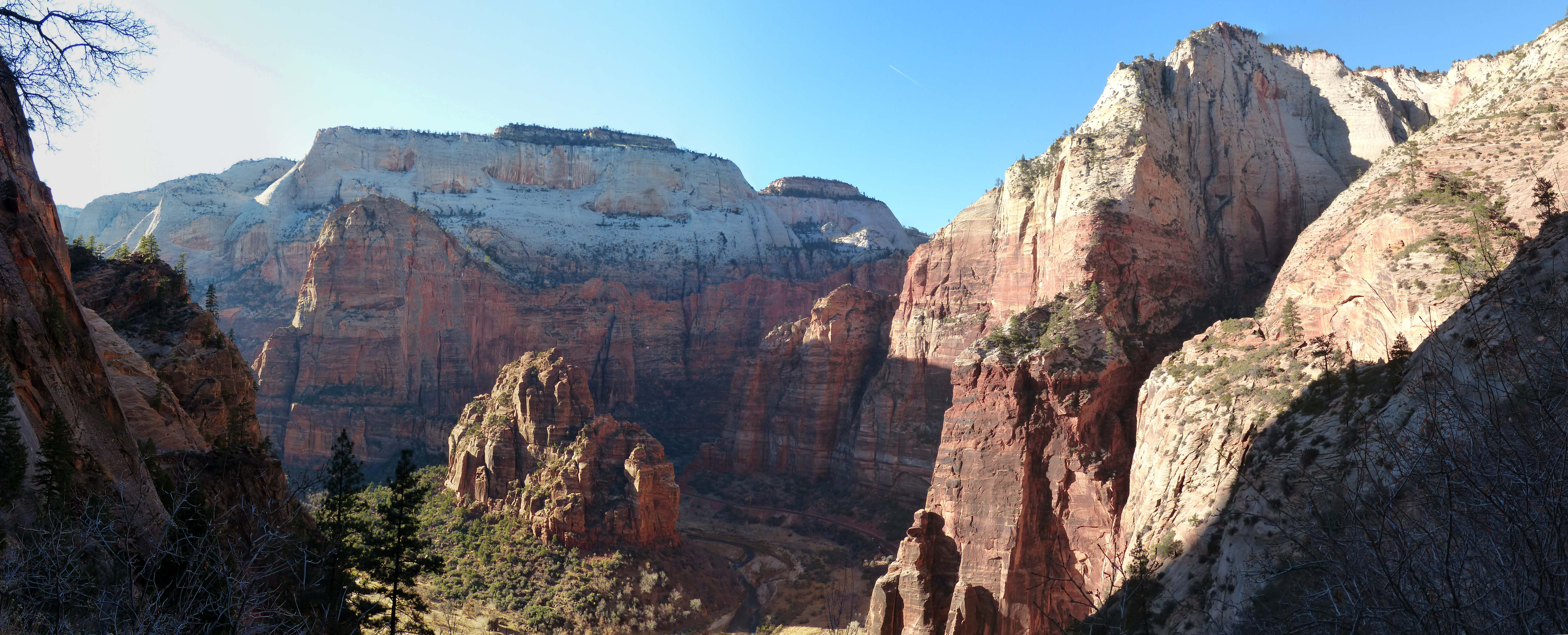
Cathedral Mountain (left) from the trail, with Observation Point upper right

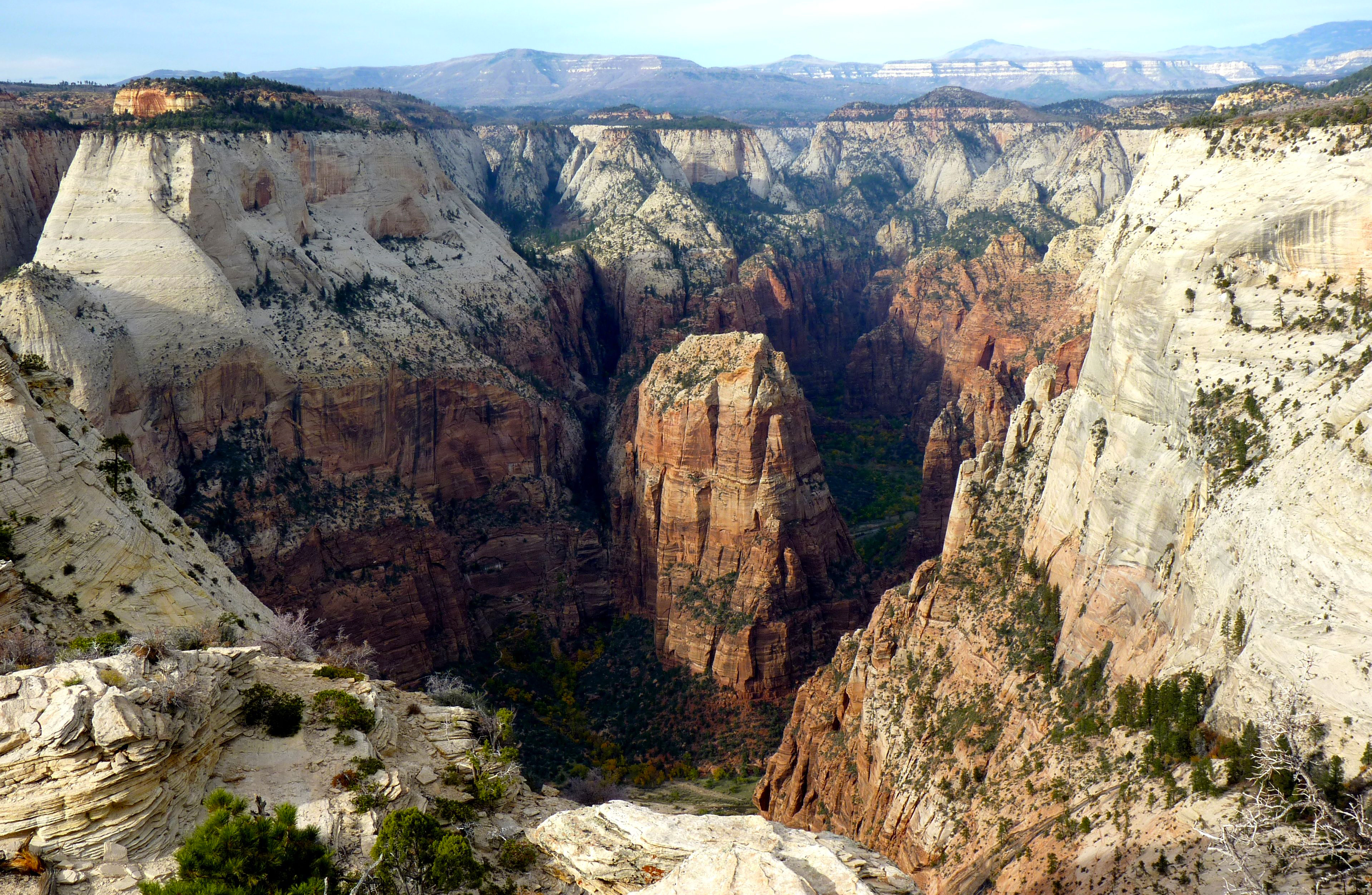
Cathedral (left) from south. Angels Landing centered.

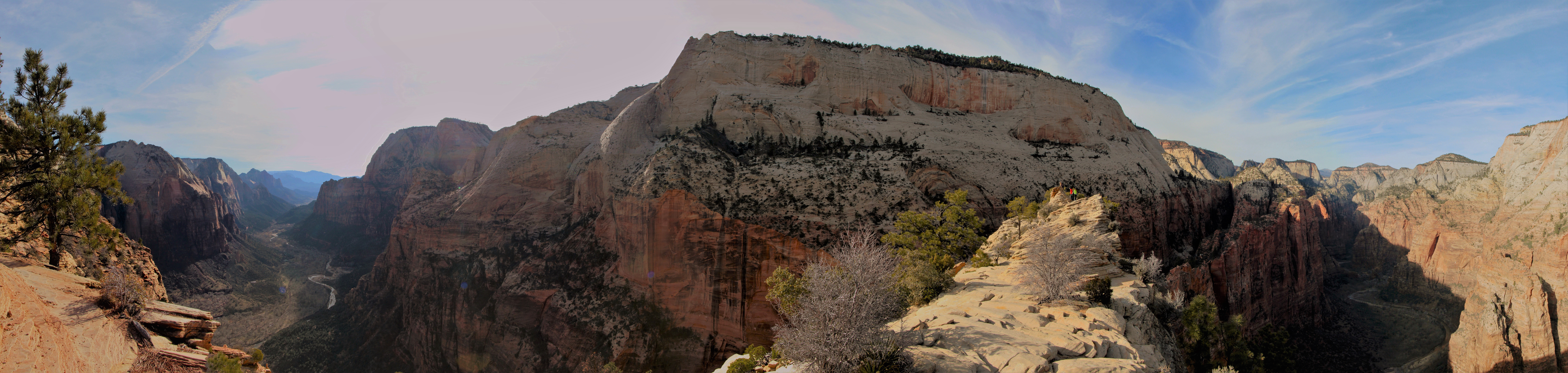
Cathedral Mountain from Angels Landing

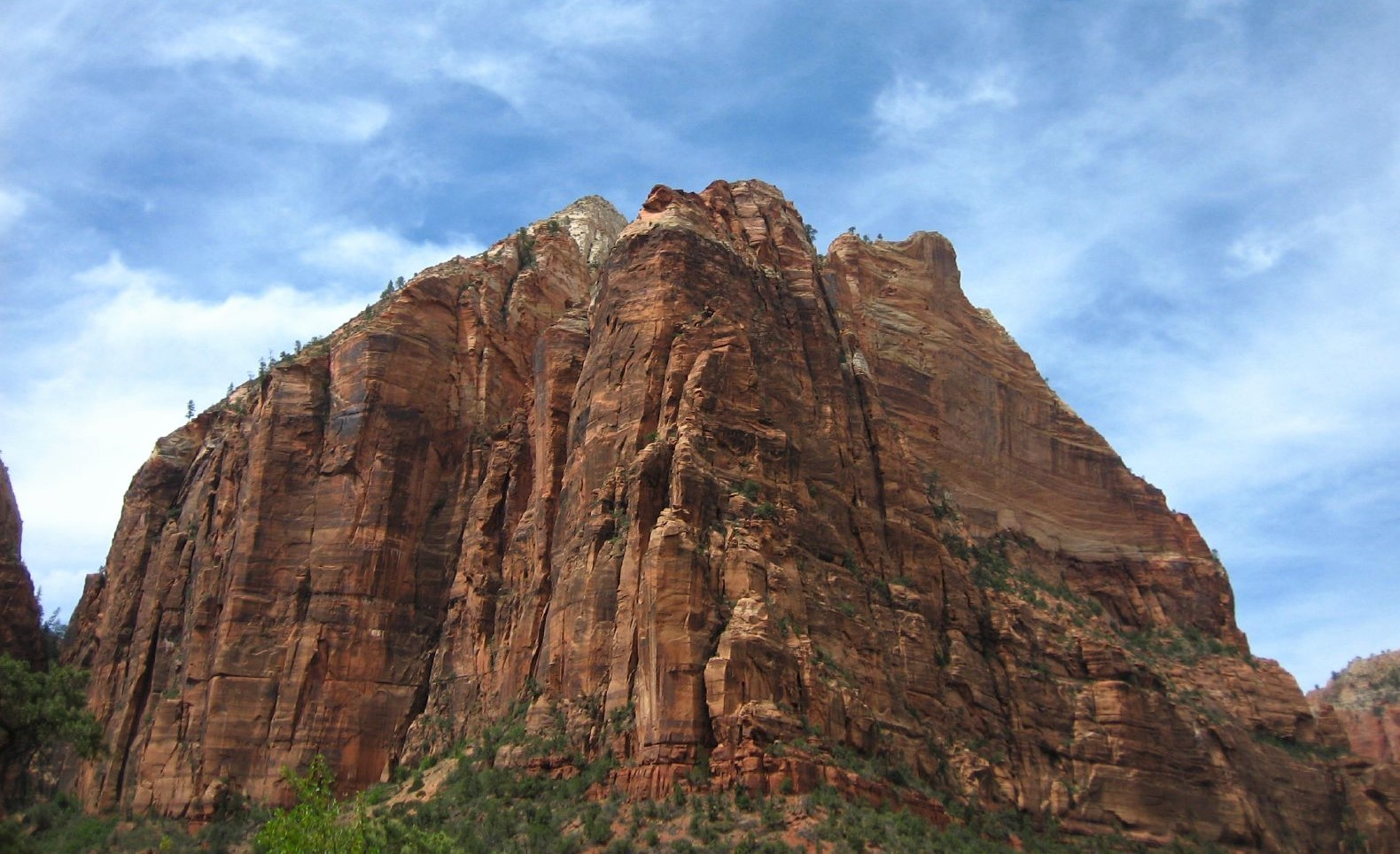
The Spearhead

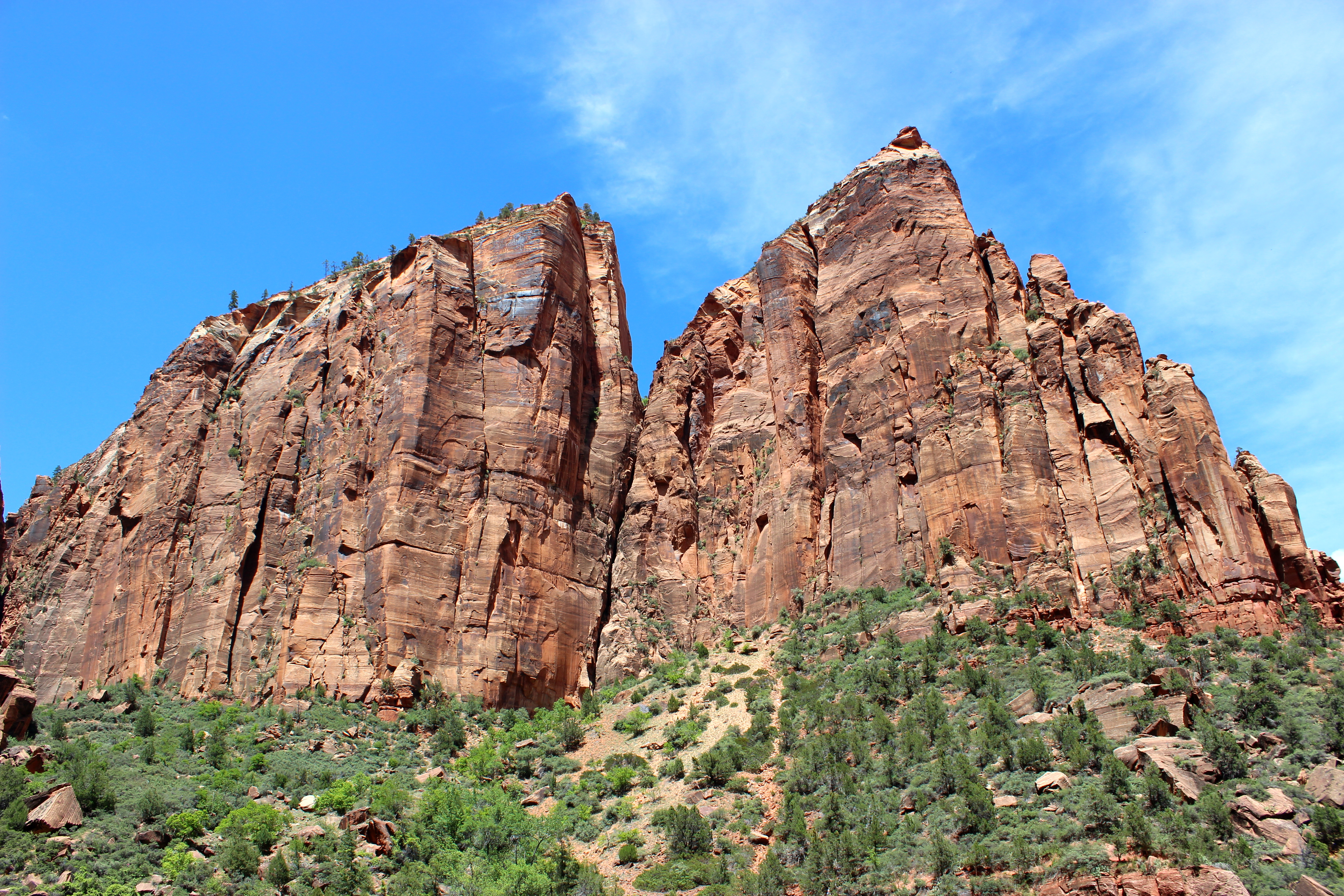
The Spearhead

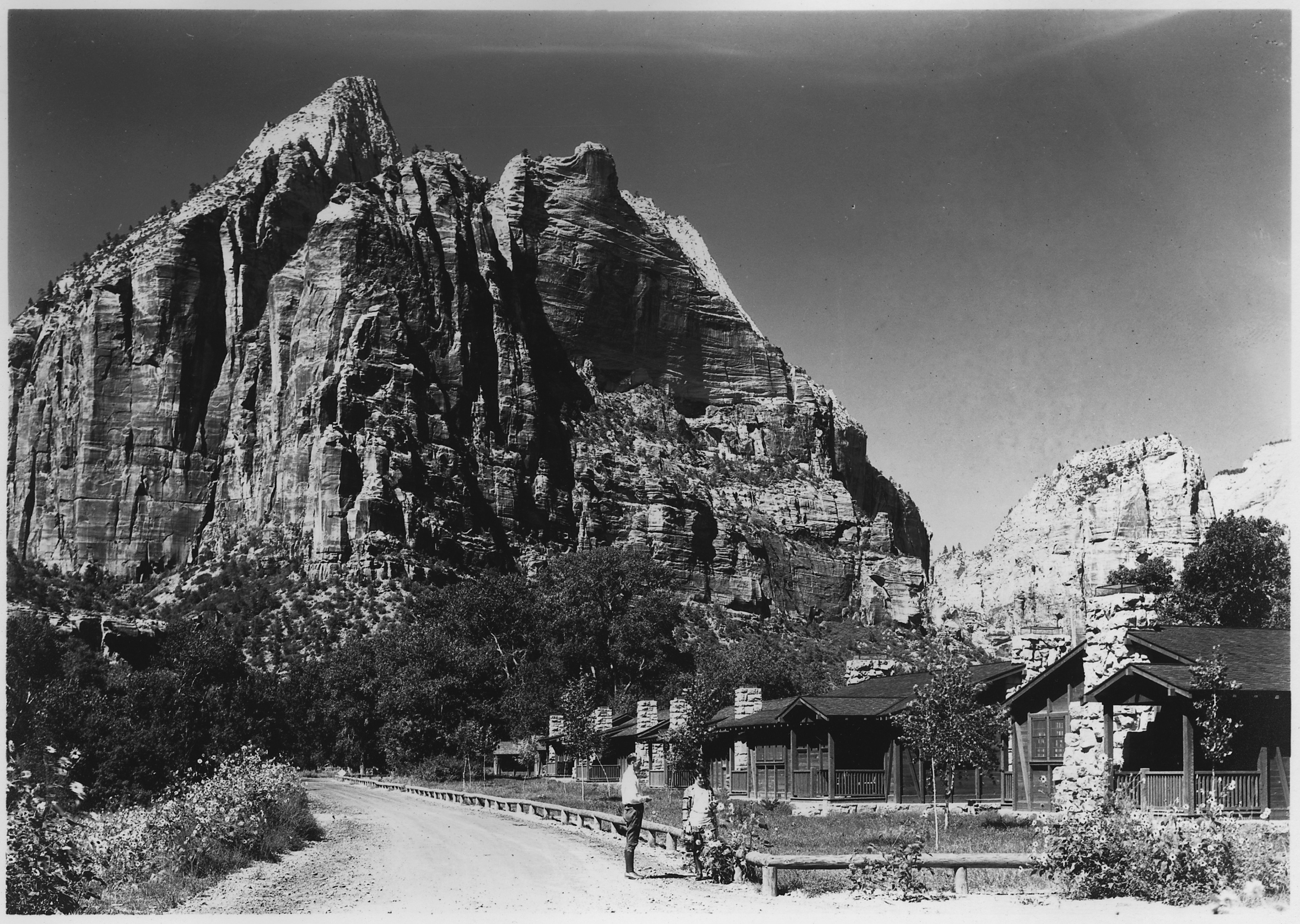
The Spearhead in 1929

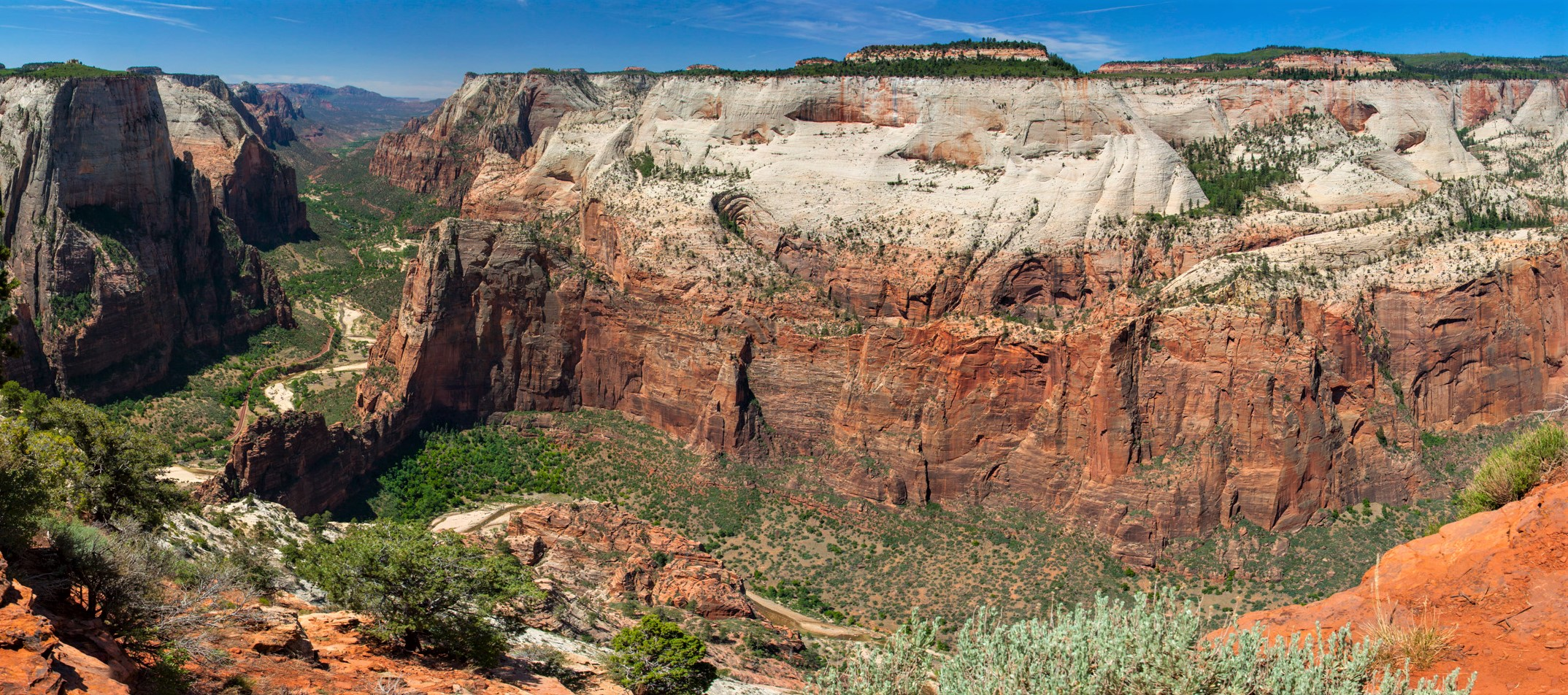
Cathedral centered

== See also ==
- List of mountains in Utah
- Geology of the Zion and Kolob canyons area
- Colorado Plateau
