= Floor of the Valley Road =

- U.S. National Register of Historic Places
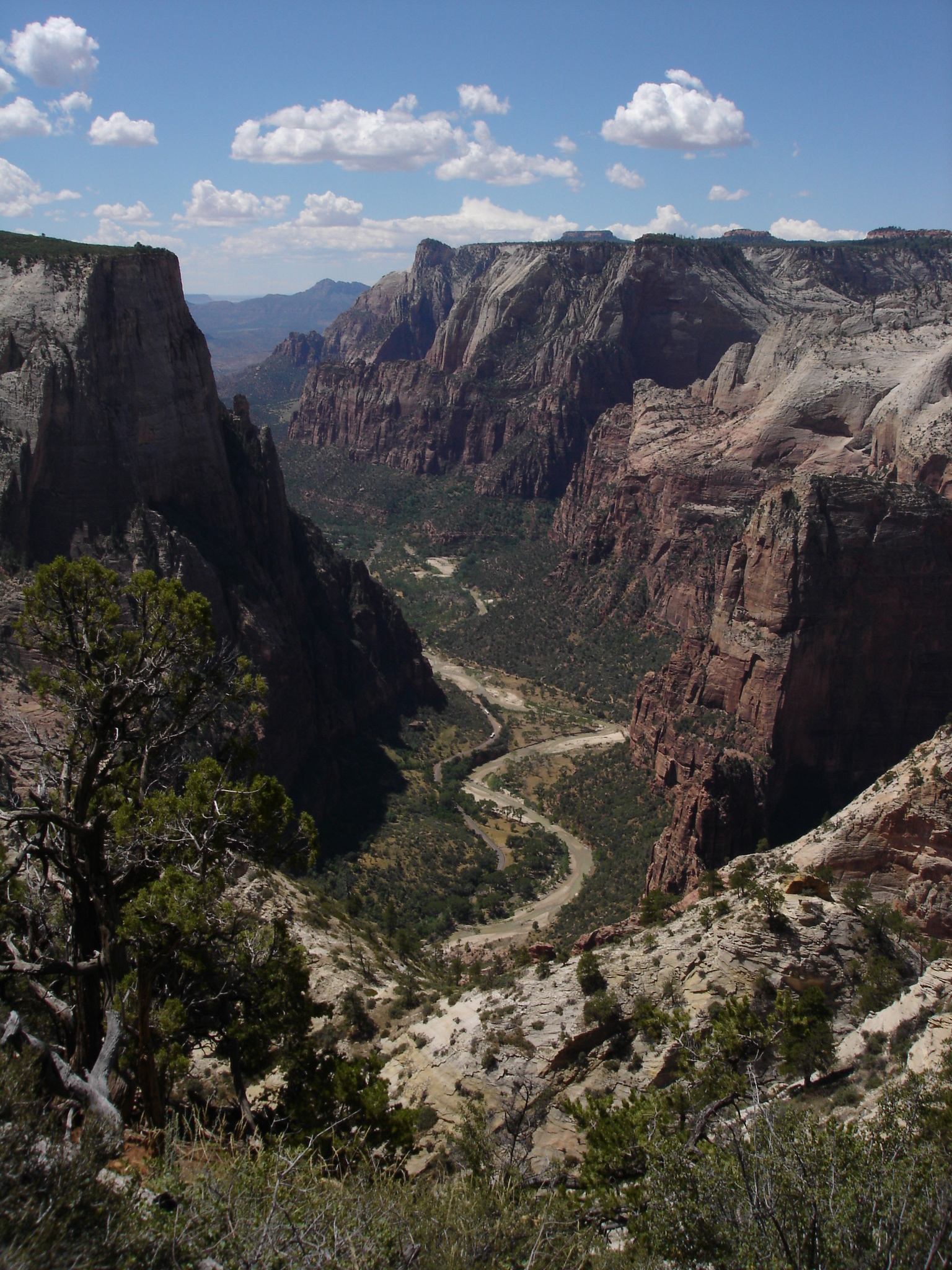
- Zion Canyon and road near Observation Point

- Location within Utah Location within the United States
- Nearest city: Springdale, Utah
- Coordinates: 37°15′20″N 112°57′17″W
- Built: 1932
- Architect: Civilian Conservation Corps; Carnes, W.G., et al.
- MPS: Zion National Park MRA
- NRHP reference No.: 96000048
- Added to NRHP: February 16, 1996

The Floor of the Valley Road, also known as the Zion Canyon Scenic Drive, follows the canyon of the North Fork of the Virgin River, also known as Zion Canyon, through Zion National Park, Utah.

== History ==
A precursor to the present nine-mile road was first built in 1916, but was later redesigned by the National Park Service Branch of Plans and Designs to highlight the natural features of the valley while presenting a natural-appearing built environment. The road begins at the south boundary of the park and ends at the Temple of Sinawava.

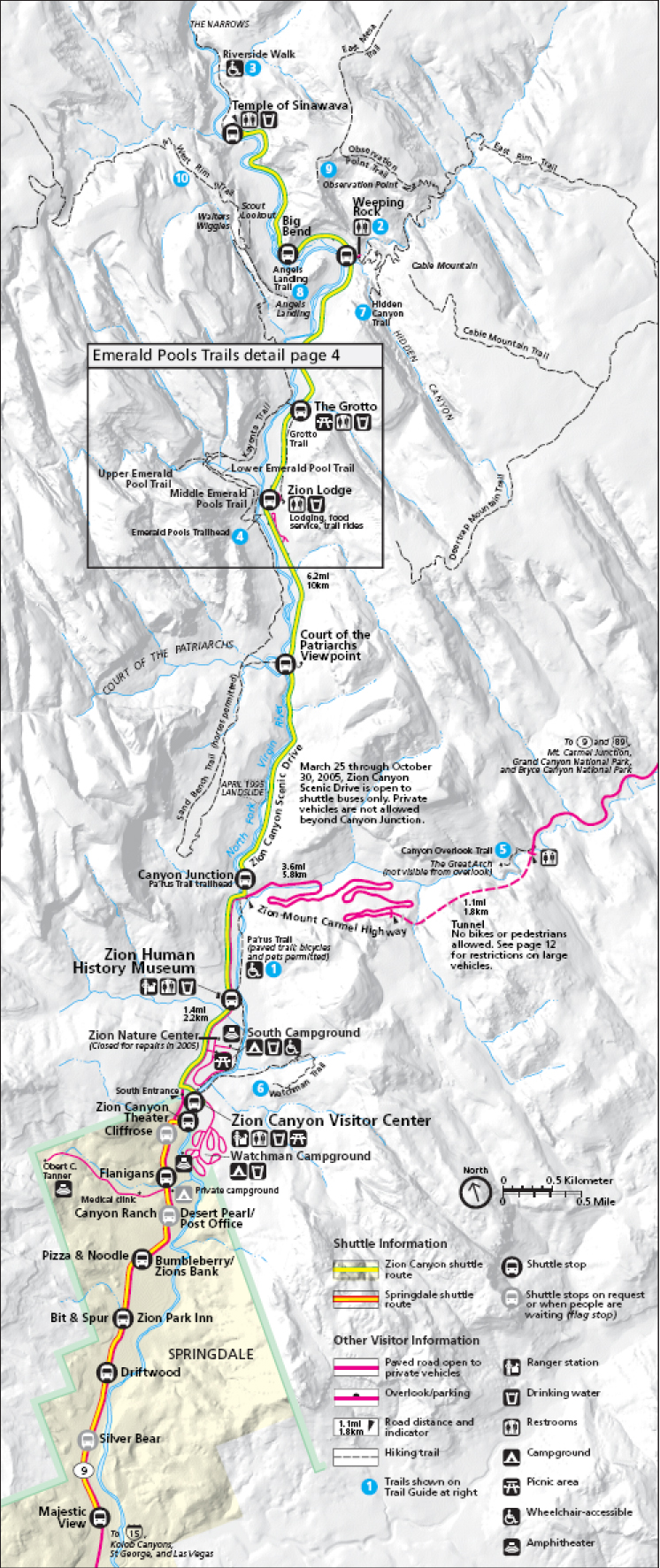
Map of the road in Zion Canyon

From the South Entrance to Canyon Junction at the mouth of Zion Canyon the road has been reconstructed and has lost many of the characteristic features of the 1930s construction.

The original 1916 road, built by Park Service engineer W.O. Tufts, was a single-lane dirt road that extended as far as the Weeping Rock parking area. In 1925, a gravel-surfaced road, called the "Government Road" replaced the original road and extended all the way to the Temple of Sinawava.

In 1931 and 1932, the present road was constructed on a new alignment as a Depression-era public works project. Further construction was performed from 1933 to 1942 by Civilian Conservation Corps labor.

== Design ==
The road's design uses local materials such as red sandstone and rustic construction techniques according to the prevailing 1930s Park Service policy of naturalistic design. The Cable Creek Bridge is separately nominated to the National Register of Historic Places as a particularly prominent example of the style. The road surface is coated with red aggregate to continue the design theme.

== Traffic restrictions ==
Traffic congestion in the narrow canyon was recognized as a major problem in the 1990s and a public transportation system using propane-powered shuttle buses was instituted in the year 2000. From April through October, the scenic drive in Zion Canyon is closed to private vehicles and visitors ride the shuttle buses.

== See also ==
- Zion-Mount Carmel Highway
