= Angels Landing =

Rock formation in Zion National Park, Utah, United States

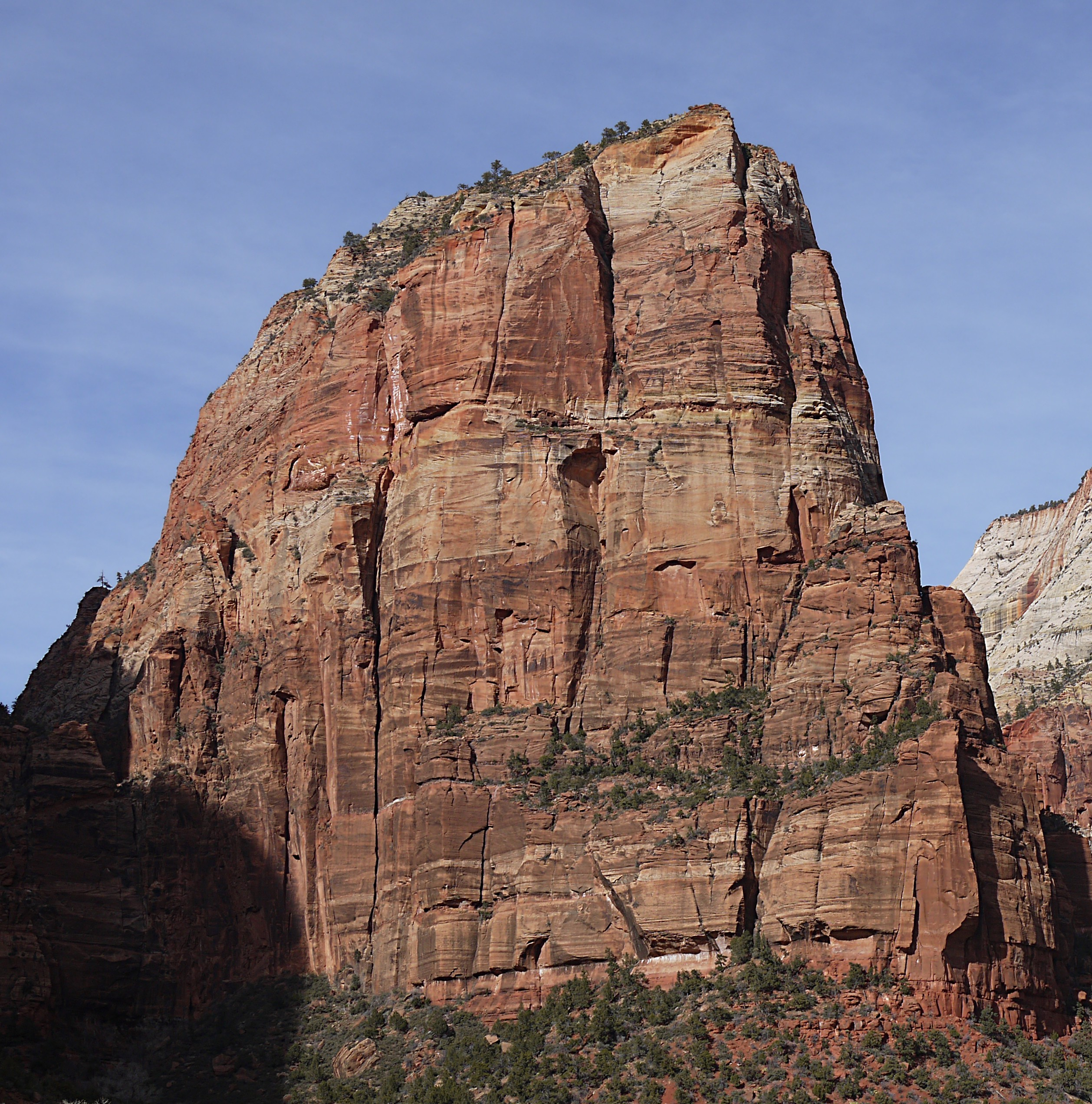
- Angels Landing, Zion Canyon

Highest point
- Elevation: 1,760 m (5,770 ft)
- Prominence: 430 ft (130 m)
- Parent peak: Cathedral Mountain (6,930 ft)
- Isolation: 0.3 mi (0.48 km)
- Coordinates: 37°16′10″N 112°56′53″W

Geography
- Location within Utah Location within the United States
- Location: Zion National Park, Washington County, Utah
- Topo map: USGS Temple of Sinawava

Geology
- Rock age: Jurassic
- Mountain type: Monolith
- Rock type: Navajo Sandstone

Angels Landing, known previously as the Temple of Aeolus, is a 1,488-foot (454 m) tall rock formation in Zion National Park in southwestern Utah, United States. A renowned trail cut into solid rock in 1926 leads to the top of Angels Landing and provides panoramic views of Zion Canyon.

== Trail ==
The trail to Angels Landing is 2.5 miles (4.0 km) long with an approximate 1,500 feet (460 m) elevation gain. The hike is rated as a class 3 difficulty based on the Yosemite Decimal System. It begins at the Grotto drop-off point on the park's shuttle system, which operates from early spring through late fall. It roughly follows the path of the Virgin River for some distance along the West Rim Trail, slowly gaining elevation in sandy terrain. Most of the trail is uphill on the way up to Angels Landing. As the trail gets steeper and leaves the river, it becomes paved. After a series of steep switchbacks, the trail goes through the area between Angels Landing and the Zion Canyon that is a gradual ascent. Walter's Wiggles, a series of 21 steep switchbacks, are the last hurdle before Scout Lookout. The wiggles are named after Walter Ruesch, who was the first superintendent for Zion National Park and constructed the switchbacks in 1926.

Scout Lookout is generally the turnaround point for those who are unwilling to make the final summit push to the top of Angels Landing. The last half-mile of the trail is strenuous and lined with numerous sharp drop-offs and narrow paths. Chains to grip are provided for portions of the last half-mile to the top at 5,790 feet (1,760 m).

The half-mile section up the spine, the Angels Landing Trail-West Rim Trail, which "follows a narrow, chain-lined ridge with sheer drop-offs on both sides", was listed in the National Register of Historic Places in 1987.

In April 2026, a hiker fell to his death from a chained part of the trail on the north side. Prior to this, the most recent death was in May 2024. As of 2025, 18 deaths have been confirmed at or near Angels Landing, resulting in this trail having the highest number of hiking deaths within Zion National Park and the state of Utah.

Since 2022, hikers who go beyond Scout Lookout have been required to have a permit. This permit program was instituted due to overcrowding in prior years and is intended to improve visitor experiences, protect the park, and increase the safety of the hike.

== Climate ==
Spring and fall are the most favorable seasons to visit Angels Landing. According to the Köppen climate classification system, it is located in a cold semi-arid climate zone, which is defined by the coldest month having an average mean temperature below 32 °F (0 °C), and at least 50% of the total annual precipitation being received during the spring and summer. This desert climate receives less than 10 inches (250 millimeters) of annual rainfall, and snowfall is generally light during the winter.

== Climbing routes ==
Climbing routes on Angels Landing include:

- Prodigal Son – V class 5.7 C2 – 9 pitches
- Lowe Route – IV/V class 5.13 or 5.9 C3 – 13 pitches
- Northeast Buttress – IV class 5.10+ – 8 pitches
- South Face – II class 5.10 – 3 pitches
- Ball and Chain – V class 5.12d A0 – 9 pitches
- Angels Hair – V class 5.13a – 11 pitches

== Gallery ==
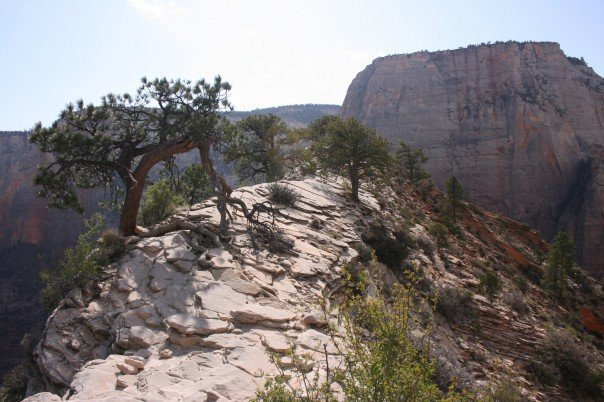
Summit of Angels Landing

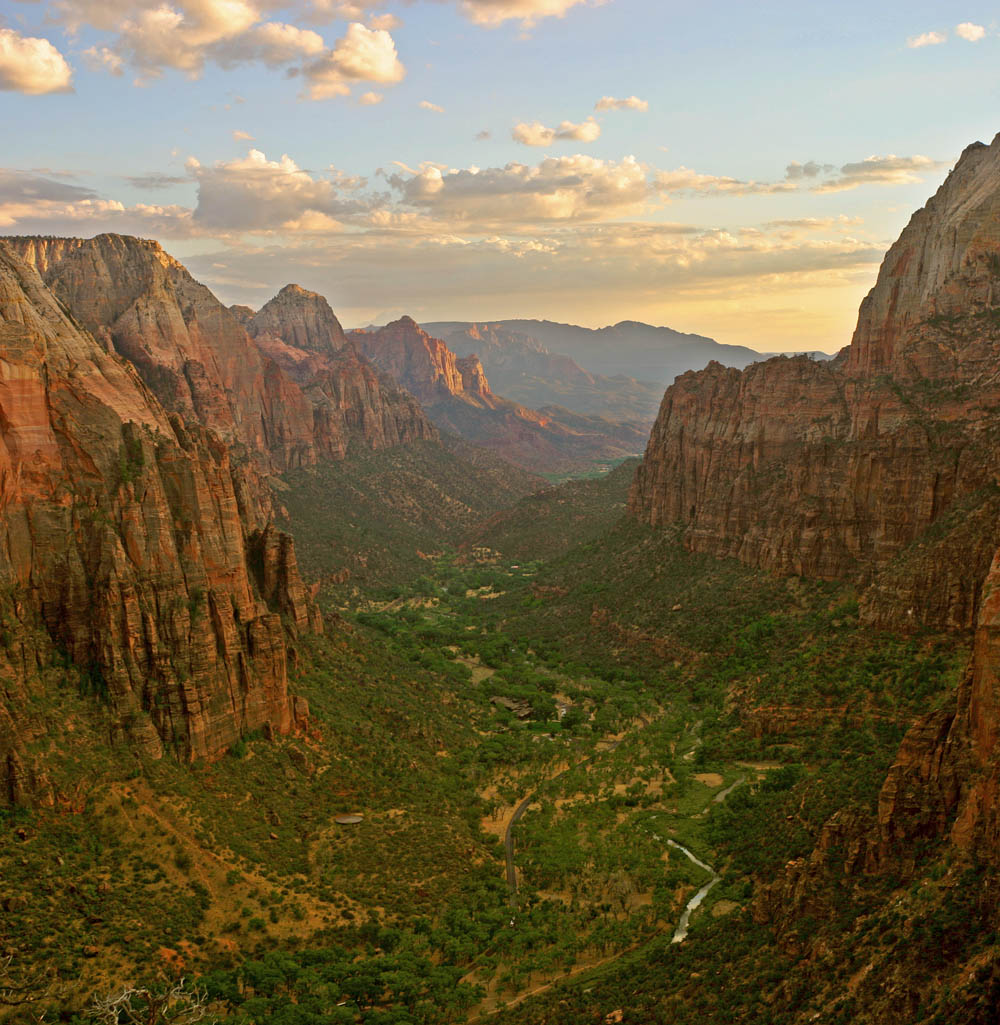
Zion Canyon as seen from the summit of Angels Landing

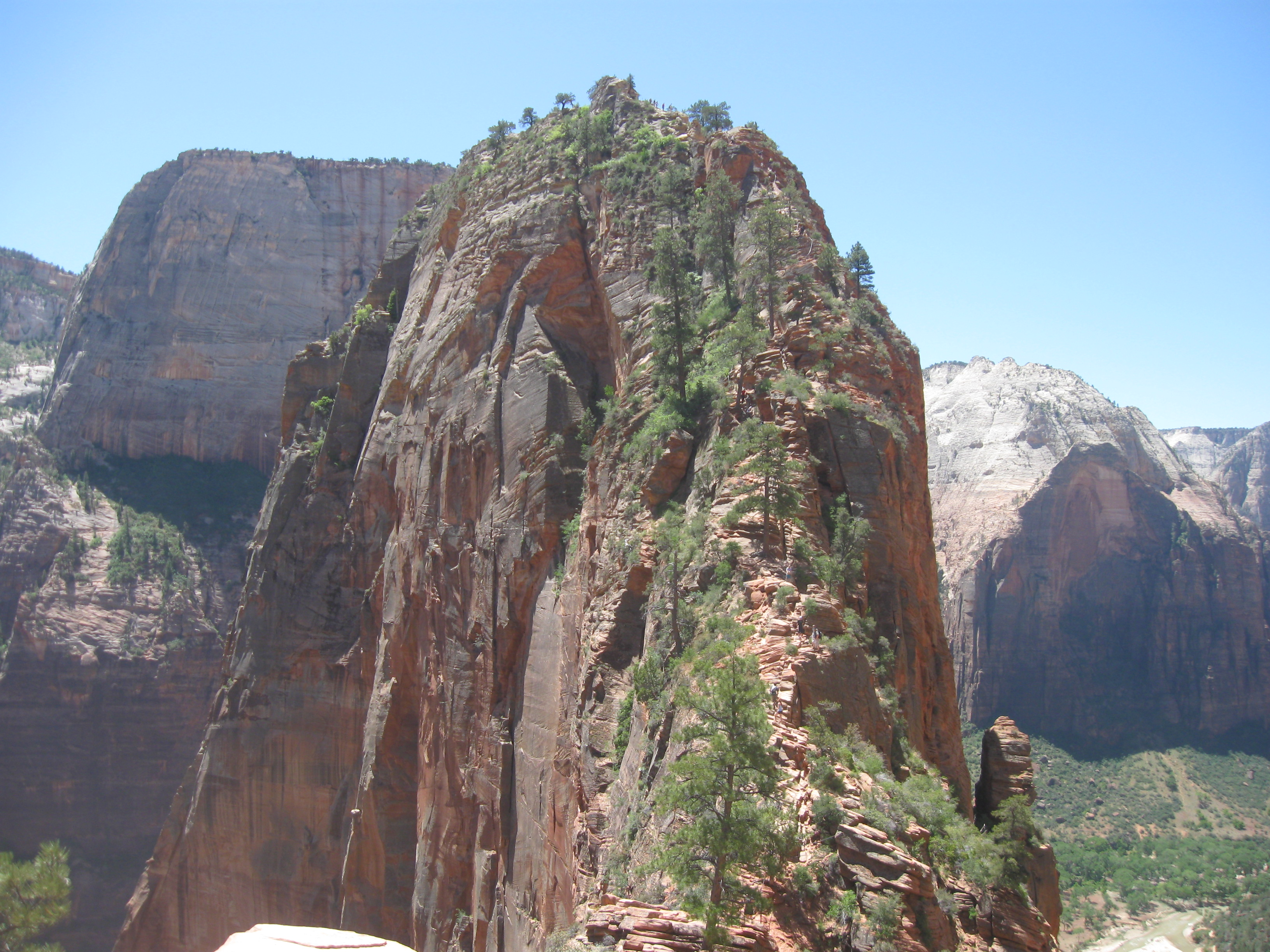
Looking toward the top of Angels Landing

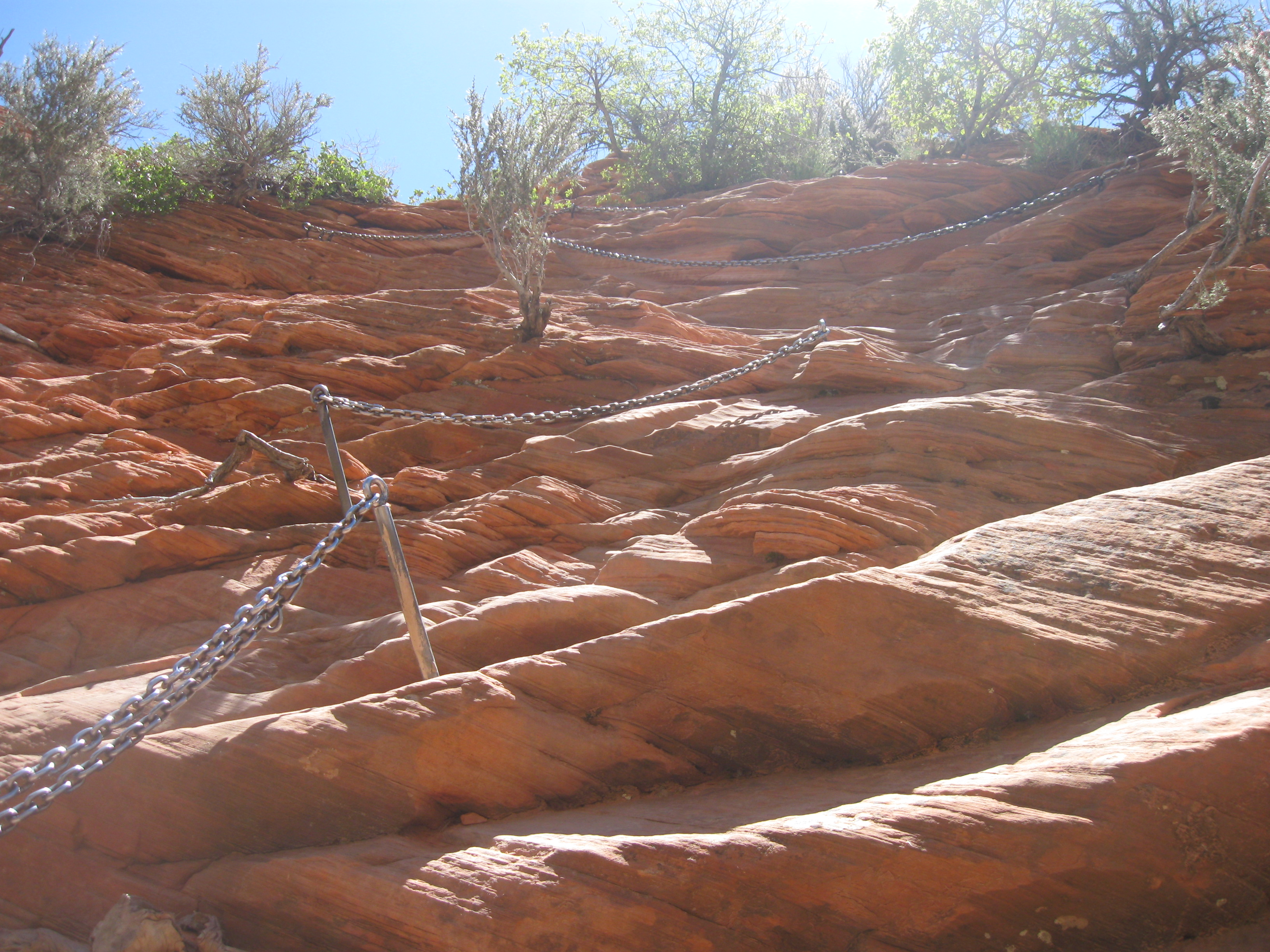
Angels Landing trail including chain cables

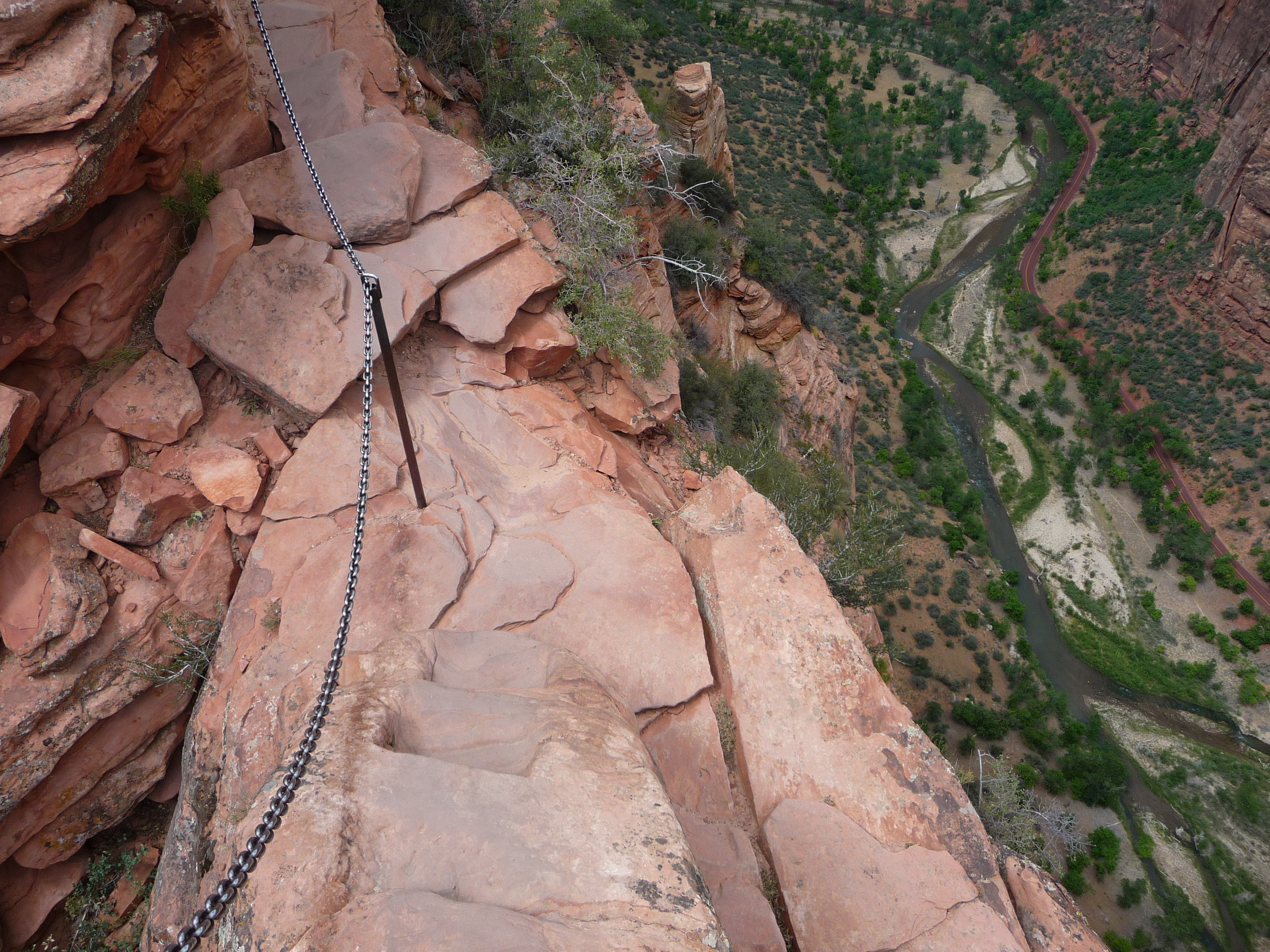
Zion Canyon viewed from Angels Landing, showing the immense vertical relief
Panorama of Zion National Park taken from Angels Landing.

== See also ==
- Great White Throne
