= Zion Lodge Historic District =

Historic district in Utah, United States

- U.S. National Register of Historic Places
- U.S. Historic district
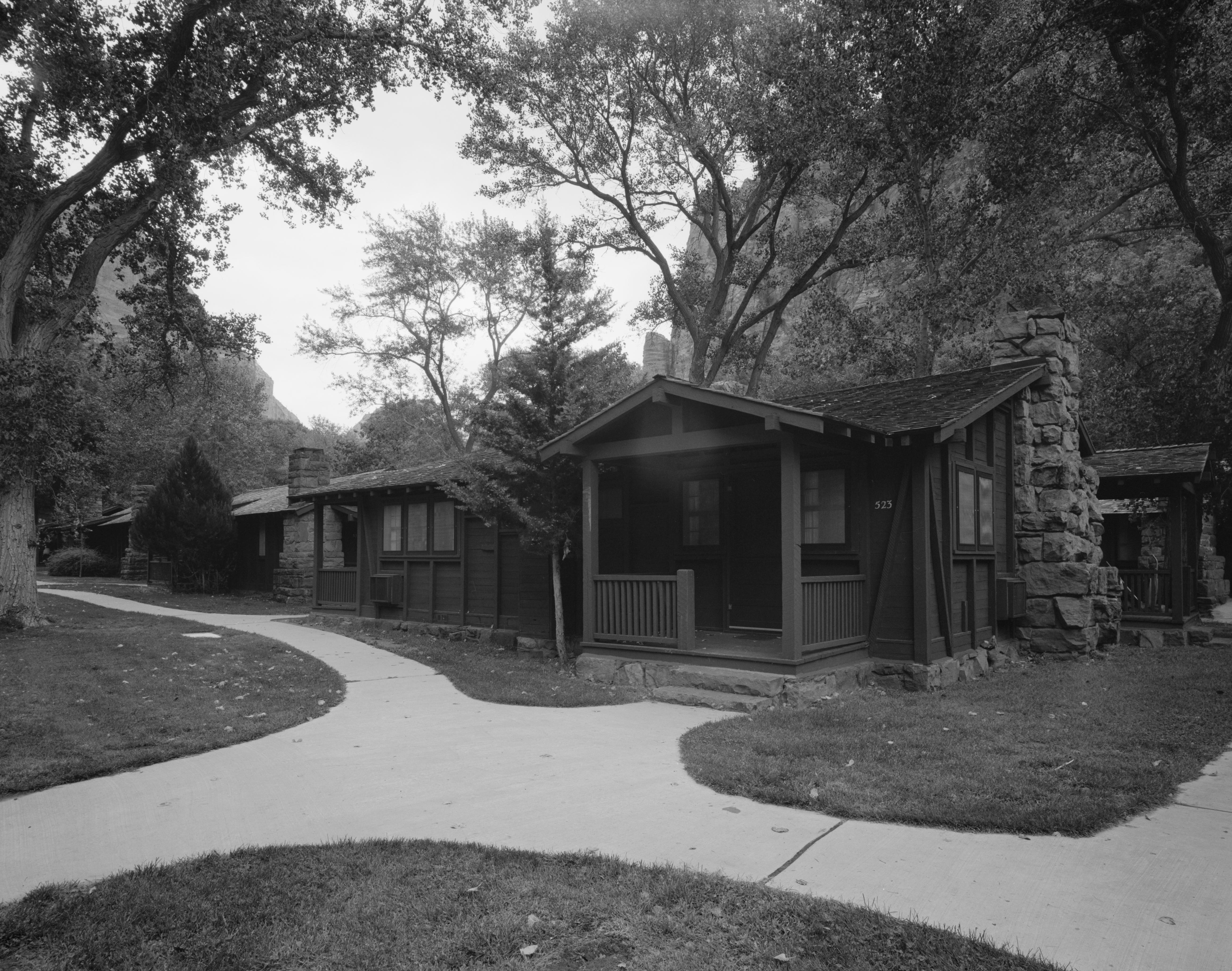
- Western Cabins in 1984

- Location within Utah Location within the United States
- Nearest city: Springdale, Utah
- Coordinates: 37°15′1″N 112°57′17″W
- Built: 1925
- Architect: Underwood, Gilbert Stanley
- Architectural style: Rustic
- NRHP reference No.: 82001718
- Added to NRHP: August 24, 1982

The Zion Lodge Historic District surrounds the rustic lodge originally designed by Gilbert Stanley Underwood in Zion National Park. The lodge served as the center of a group of cabins, employee dormitories and support buildings which are included in the district. A swimming pool and bathhouse were demolished in 1976. The district was expanded in 1986 to include an Underwood-designed former photography studio and additional cabins.

The Zion Lodge complex was developed by the Utah Parks Company to provide lodging for tourists at Zion. The Utah Parks Company was owned by the Union Pacific Railroad, which had developed a strong relationship with Underwood. Underwood designed most of the structures in the lodge community using principles of rustic design favored by the National Park Service, a style that was developed and promoted, in part, by Underwood himself.

The district is centered on the Zion Lodge. Underwood's National Park Service Rustic style lodge burned in 1966 and was replaced by a prefabricated structure on the same foundation. A 1990 renovation added elements of Underwood's original design to the 1966 structure. The district includes:

- Female Dormitory Built in 1927 to Underwood's design, in the "studs out" style with wall framing exposed outside of the wall sheathing. The one story building measures approximately 36 feet (11 m) by 69 feet (21 m), with a log-framed hipped roof. The entry porch features stone piers and heavy log roof construction.
- Male Dormitory Built in 1937 as an enlarged version of the female dormitory in a manner sympathetic to Underwood's original design. The one story building measures approximately 36 feet (11 m) by 112 feet (34 m).
- Standard Cabins Also known as "Pioneer Cabins" and "Frontier Cabins", built in the "studs out" style with an anticipated life expectancy of 20 years. The standard cabins were built beginning in 1925. In the 1940s small additions were made for bathrooms.
- Western Cabins Also known as "Deluxe Cabins, the duplex and quadruplex cabins built in a substantial manner with massive stone piers and fireplaces and open log truss ceilings. Infill walls are built in the studs out style. The Western Cabins were built beginning in 1927.
