= Zion Nature Center-Zion Inn =

- Zion Nature Center--Zion Inn
- U.S. National Register of Historic Places
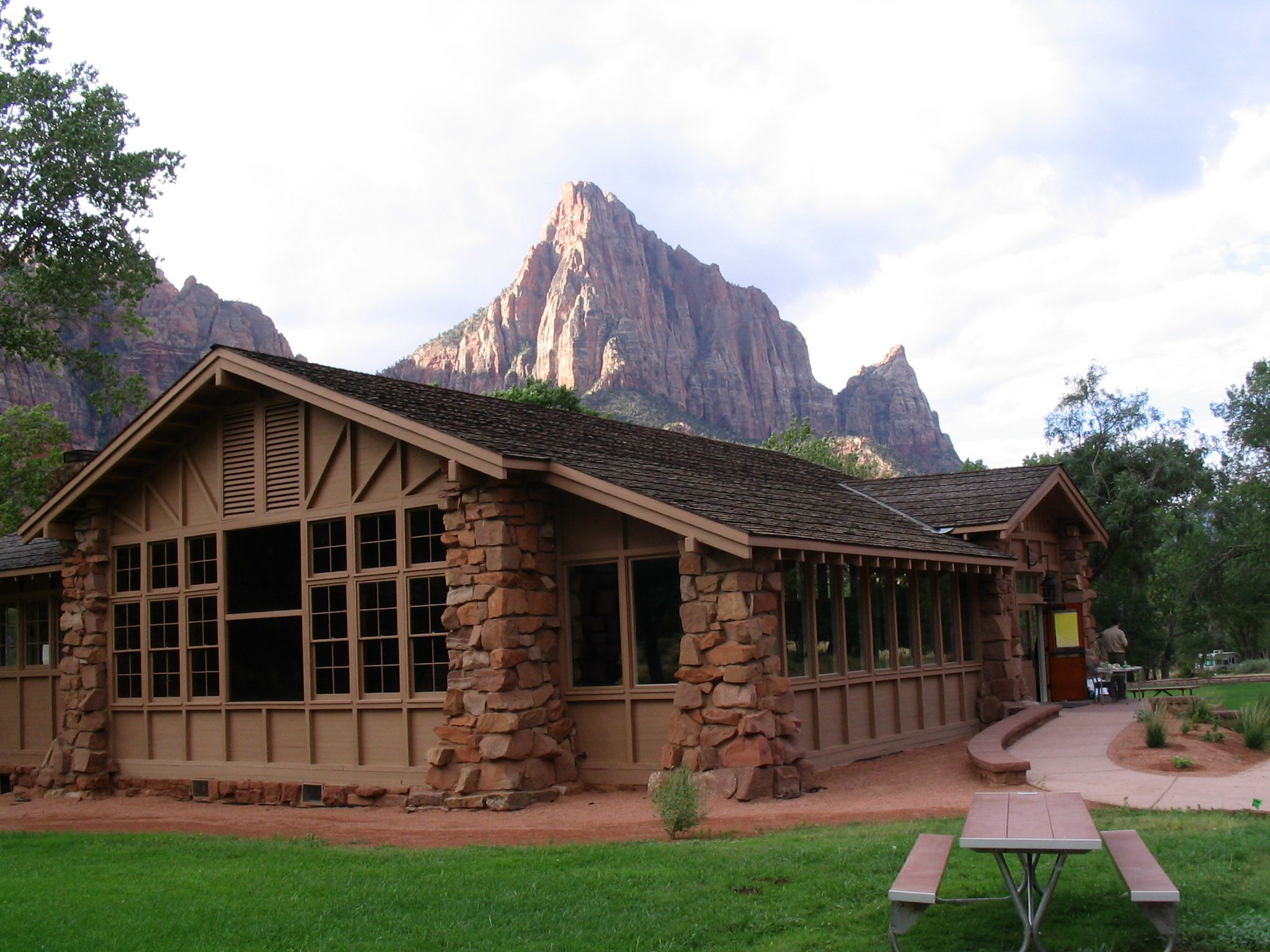

- Location within Utah Location within the United States
- Location: N of South Campground facilities, Springdale, Utah
- Coordinates: 37°12′21″N 112°58′25″W
- Built: 1934
- Architect: Utah Parks Co.; Underwood, Gilbert Stanley
- Architectural style: NPS-Rustic style
- MPS: Zion National Park MRA
- NRHP reference No.: 86003719
- Added to NRHP: February 14, 1987

The Zion Inn was designed by Gilbert Stanley Underwood for the Utah Parks Company in Zion National Park as a cafeteria, gift shop and office for the tourist cabins surrounding it. The inn was built in 1934 in the National Park Service Rustic style and was used by the Utah Parks Company until 1972, when the National Park Service remodeled it for use as a nature center. The structure features rubblestone pilasters at each corner with a "framing out" style infill. The roof is framed in log.

The Zion Inn was listed on the National Register of Historic Places in 1987. It was recently restored to the original Underwood exterior design.
