= Zion Canyon =

Canyon in Southwestern Utah US

- Mukuntuweap
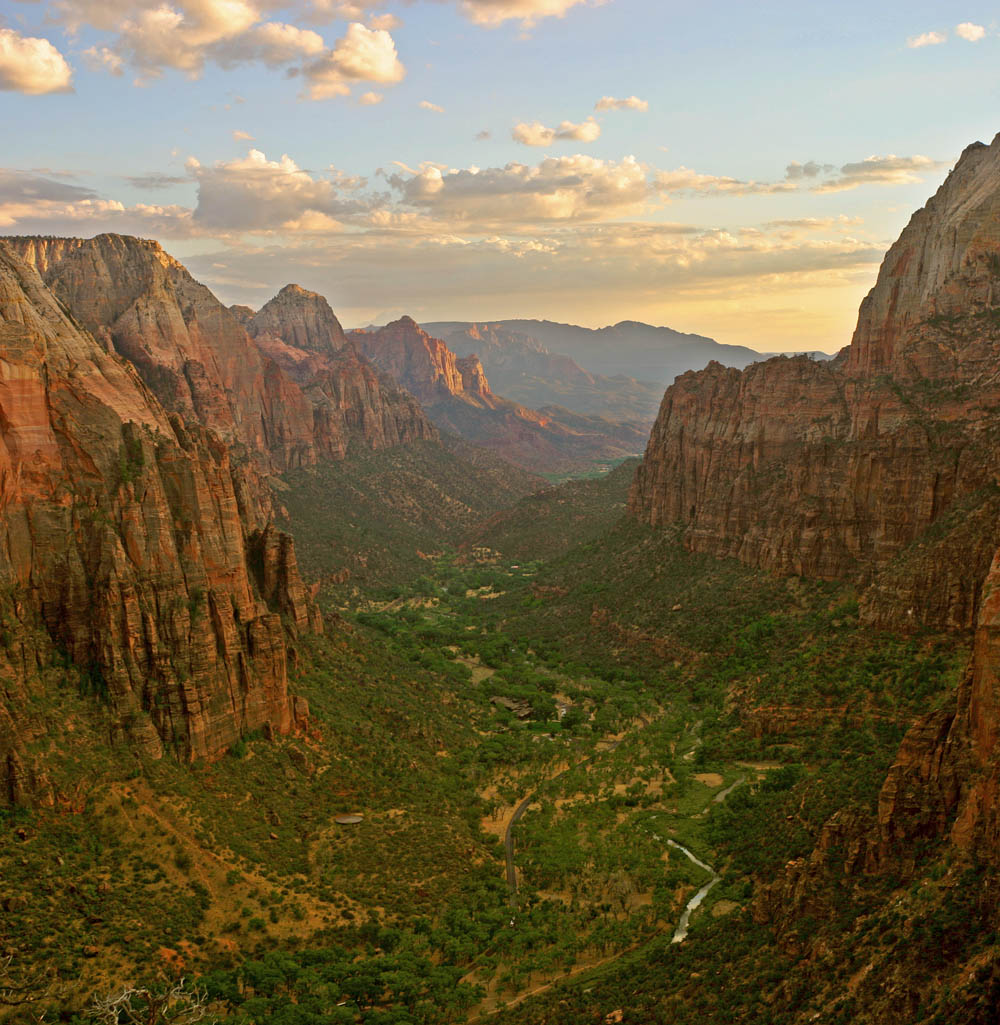
- Zion Canyon from Angels Landing at sunset

- Location within Utah
- Floor elevation: 4,300 feet (1,300 m)

Geography
- Coordinates: 37°09′54″N 113°00′43″W
- Rivers: North Fork Virgin River
- Interactive map of Zion Canyon

Zion Canyon (also called Little Zion, Mukuntuweap, Mu-Loon'-Tu-Weap, and Straight Cañon; weap is Paiute for canyon) is a deep and narrow gorge in southwestern Utah, United States, carved by the North Fork of the Virgin River. Nearly the entire canyon is located within the eastern half of Zion National Park.

== Description ==
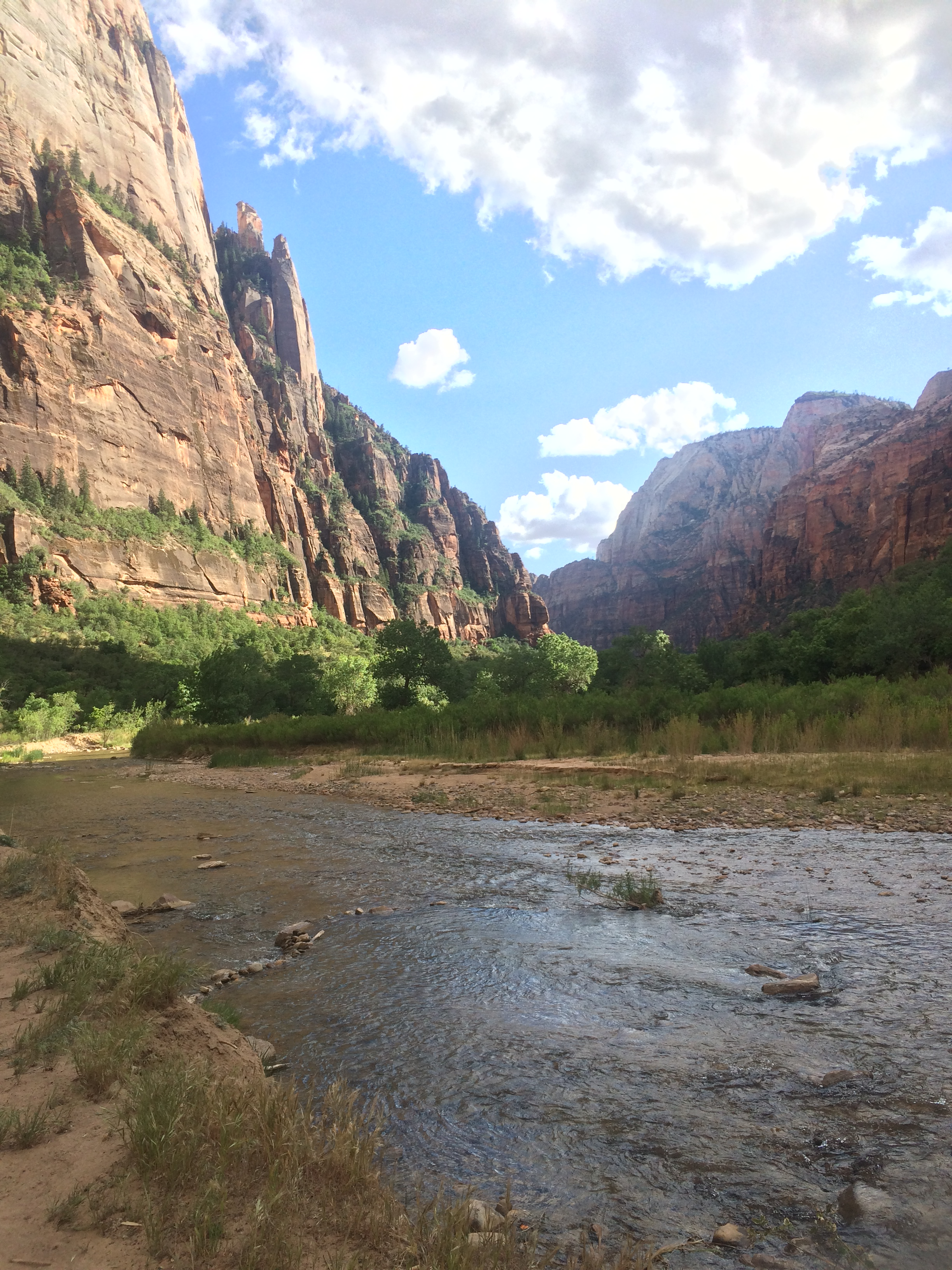
A side view of the canyon

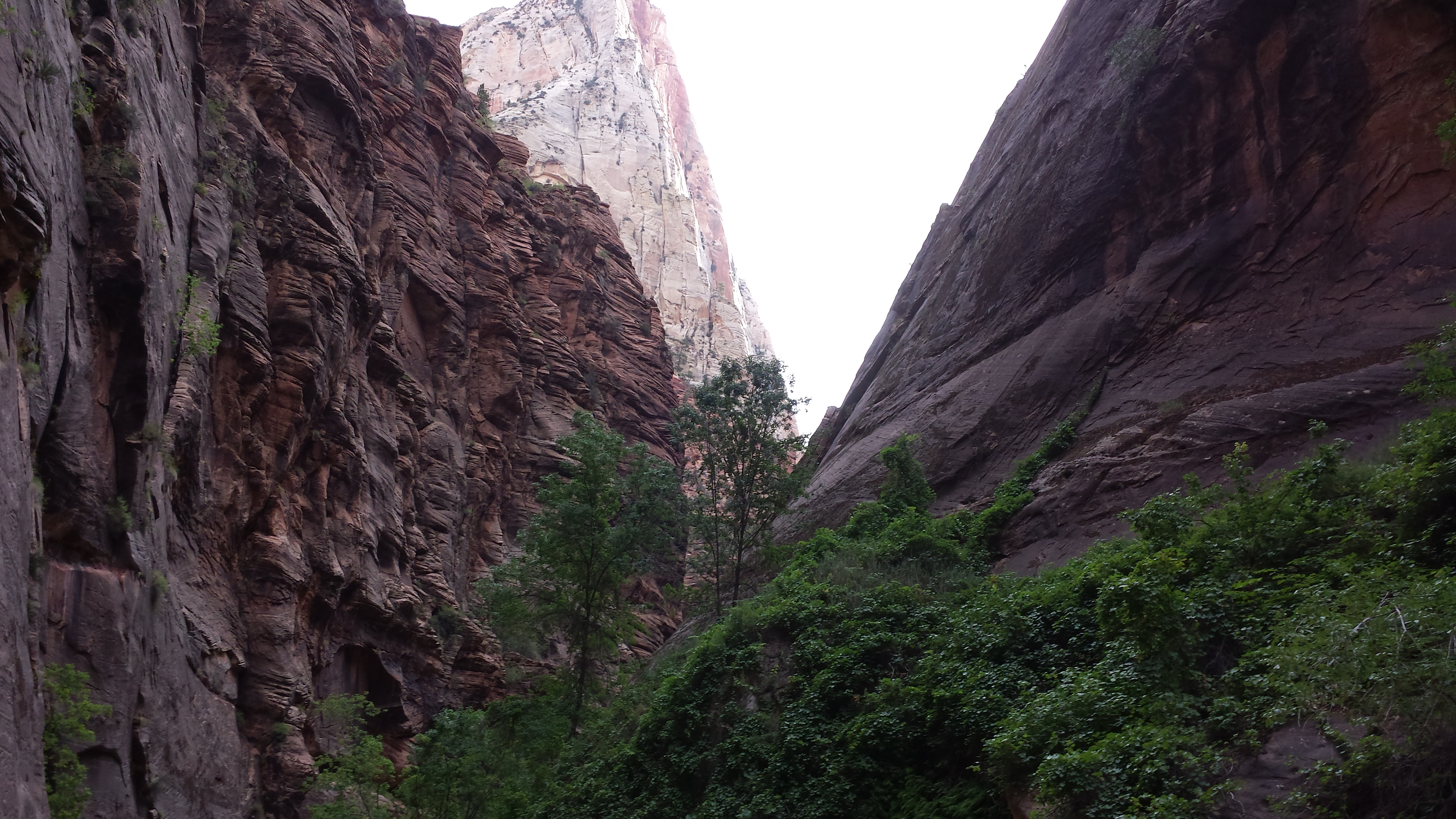
The Zion Narrows

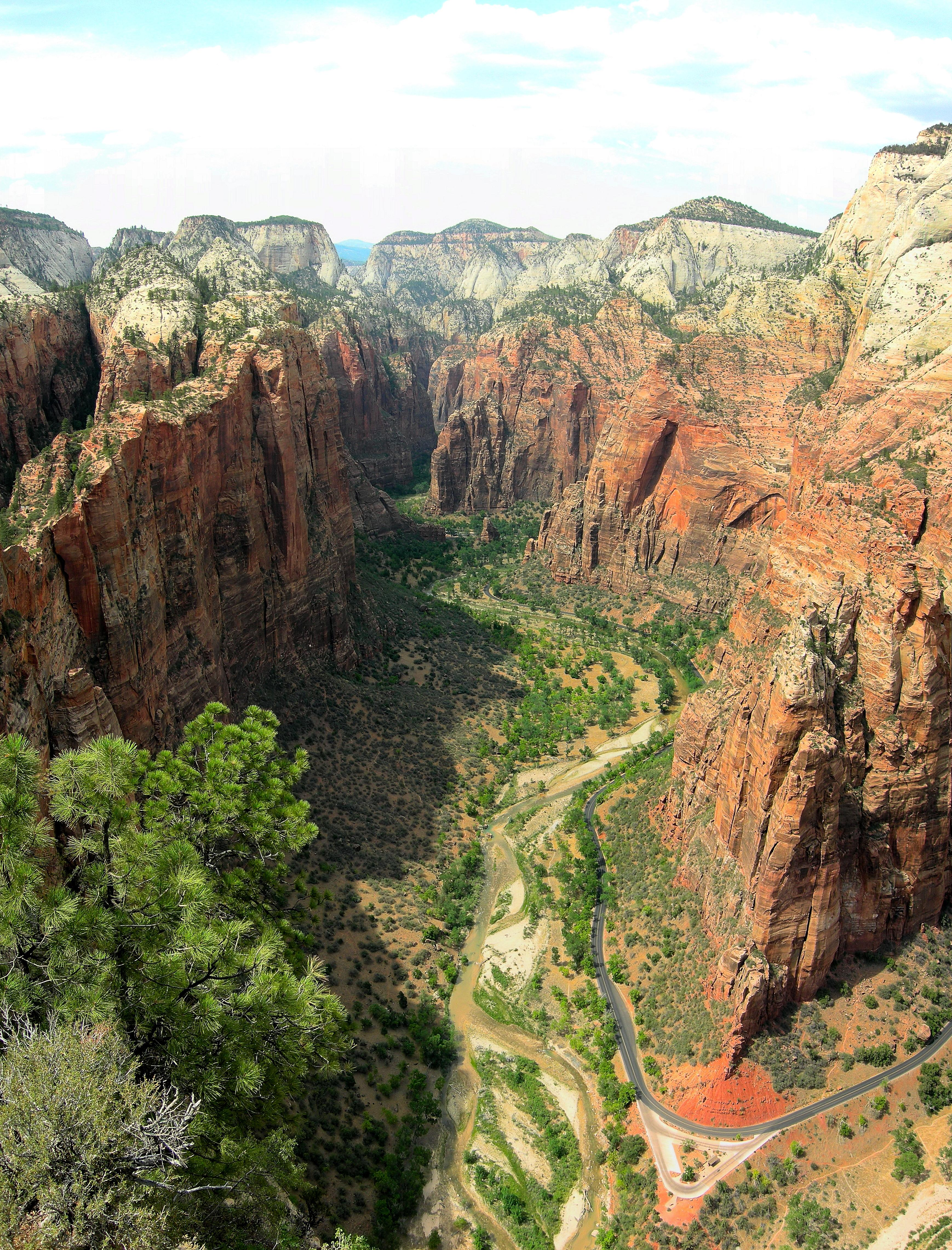
Large view of the canyon

The beginning of the canyon is usually delineated as the Temple of Sinawava, a vertical-walled natural amphitheater nearly 3,000 feet (910 m) deep. The canyon begins much further upstream, however, and runs southward about 16 miles (26 km) through the Narrows to reach the Temple, where a seasonal tributary of the North Fork plunges over a tall waterfall during spring runoff and after heavy rain. The gorge then runs southwest through the national park, approaching 2,000 feet (610 m) deep in places. While the canyon rim is dominated by desert, the canyon floor supports a forest and riparian zone watered by the North Fork Virgin River. The gorge then merges with Pine Creek Canyon as it winds out of the national park and past the community of Springdale, Utah. The canyon's end is where it meets the Virgin River; some 100 miles (160 km) northeast of Lake Mead, into which the river ultimately flows.

Zion Canyon Drive and Zion-Mount Carmel Highway are the two major roads throughout the canyon. Zion Canyon Drive ends at the Temple of Sinawava, where the Riverside Walk trail follows the river upstream to the lower end of the Zion Narrows. Hiking trails further upstream descend into the Narrows, where the canyon floor is, on average 20 feet (6.1 m) wide. Hiking is permitted in the Narrows when water levels are low enough; however, flash floods are known to rise quickly following heavy rainstorms. Many areas in the drainage of Zion Canyon have little or no soil cover, contributing to extremely brief but heavy storm runoff. In contrast, the floor of most of the main Zion Canyon is close to 1,000 feet (300 m) wide and is rich with river-deposited sediments. Tributaries to the river within the canyon include Deep, Kolob, Goose, Pine, and Oak Creeks.

== Geology and history ==
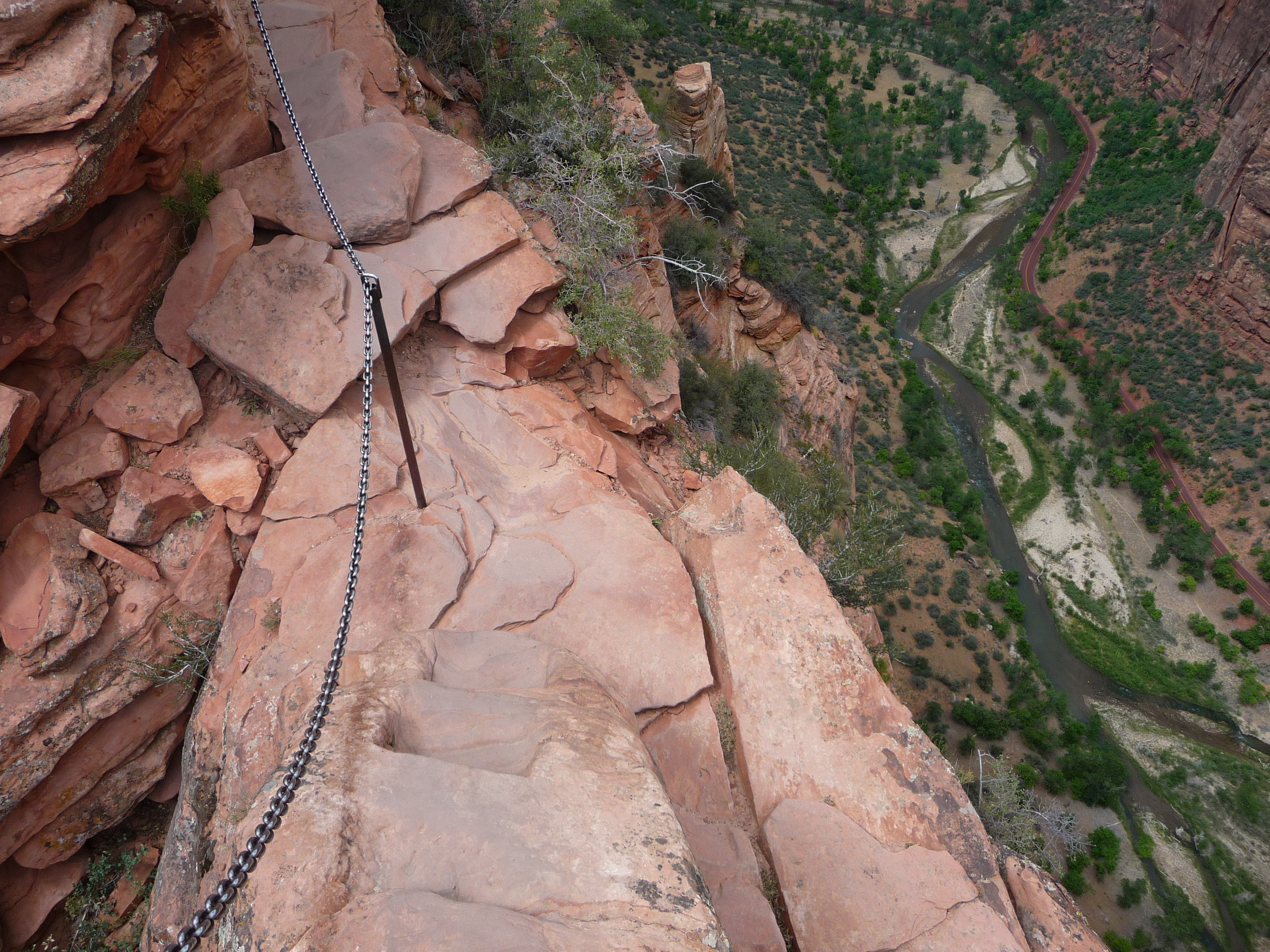
Zion Canyon viewed from a narrow point on the Angel's Landing trail, showing the immense vertical relief

Geologically Zion Canyon is part of the Navajo sandstone Colorado Plateau, which contained many joints and cracks when first uplifted, one of which was cut by the North Fork of the Virgin River to become Zion Canyon. The river was the largest force in cutting the canyon, mostly by flash floods, as the average flow of the river is very light. This relatively quick downcutting has left many seasonal tributaries with hanging valleys. Some of the largest tributaries have cut down to nearly an equal elevation as the valley floor.

Erosion continues to sculpt the canyon walls, creating natural arches and other rock formations. It is believed that there is another 1,000 feet (300 m) of vertical bedrock that the Virgin River can still erode. Mass wasting, often caused by ice wedging into cracks in the canyon walls, is another force that widens the valley. The Navajo Sandstone formation is easily eroded and is known to be very porous. Unstable geology is prevalent throughout the canyon, and occasional rockslides have formed impounded lakes in the canyon, the most recent of which was roughly 4,000 years ago. Owing to the extreme depth of the canyon, there are many springs fed by the surrounding groundwater, permitting water in the canyon to run year-round.

Mormons migrated from the lower Virgin River area in the late 1850s. One of the Mormon settlers, Isaac Behunin, is credited with naming the canyon. While admiring the canyon, Behunin reportedly stated, "A man can worship God among these great cathedrals as well as he can in any man-made church; this is Zion", though another wording is also reported. The term Zion is found frequently throughout the Bible and can refer to both a literal and a figurative place. For many Christians, it represents a place appointed by God for peace, safety, and rest.

Explorer John Wesley Powell is credited with the name Mukuntuweap, supposedly the native name of the canyon. In 1909, the canyon was first declared a national monument, and in 1919 it was declared a national park. The Zion-Mount Carmel Highway, cutting through Pine Creek Canyon and lower Zion Canyon, first opened in 1930.

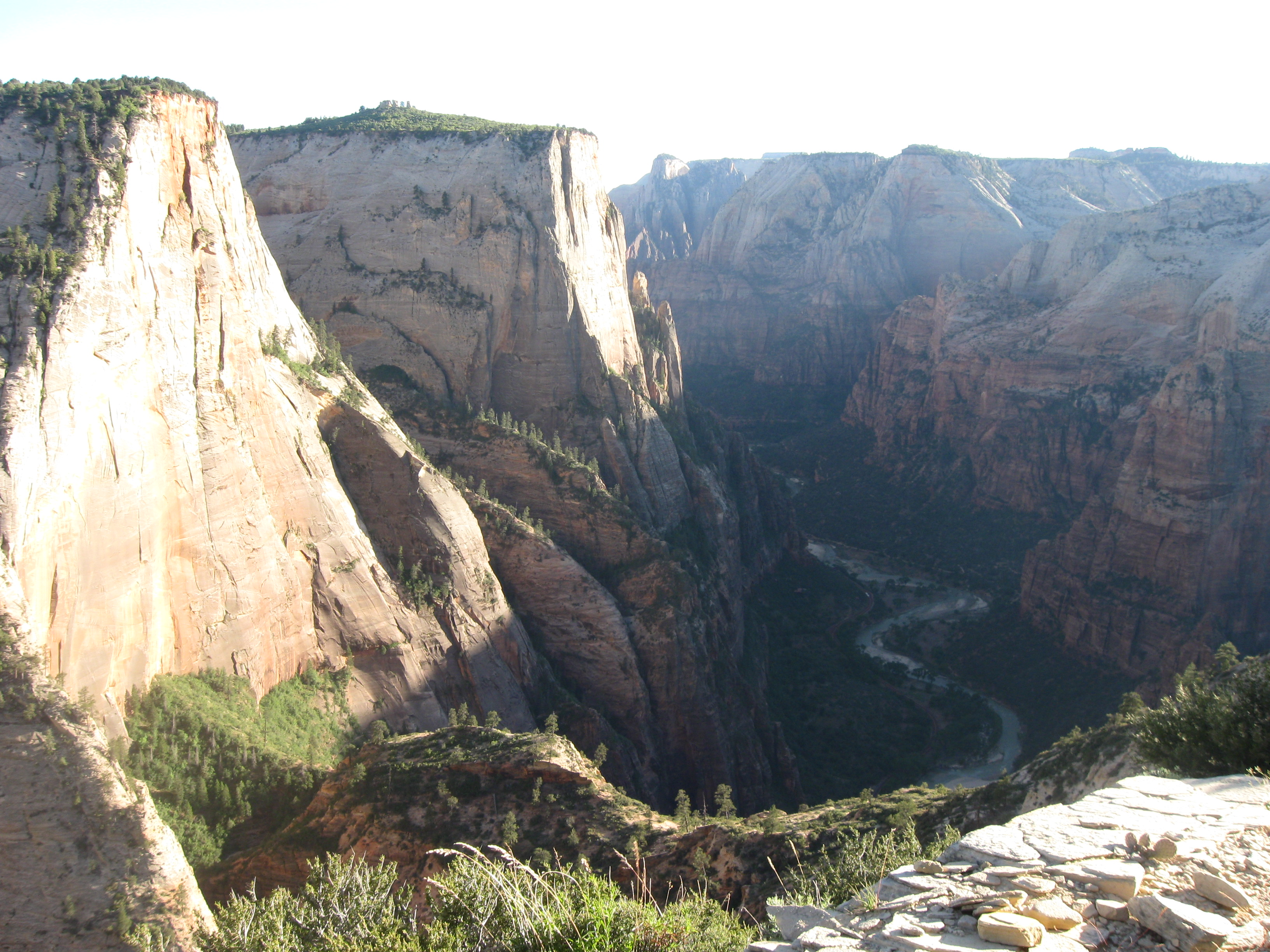
Zion Canyon from the trail to Observation Point

== See also ==
- Geology of the Zion and Kolob canyons area
