= Observation Point (Zion National Park) =

1,983m elevation Navajo Sandstone feature

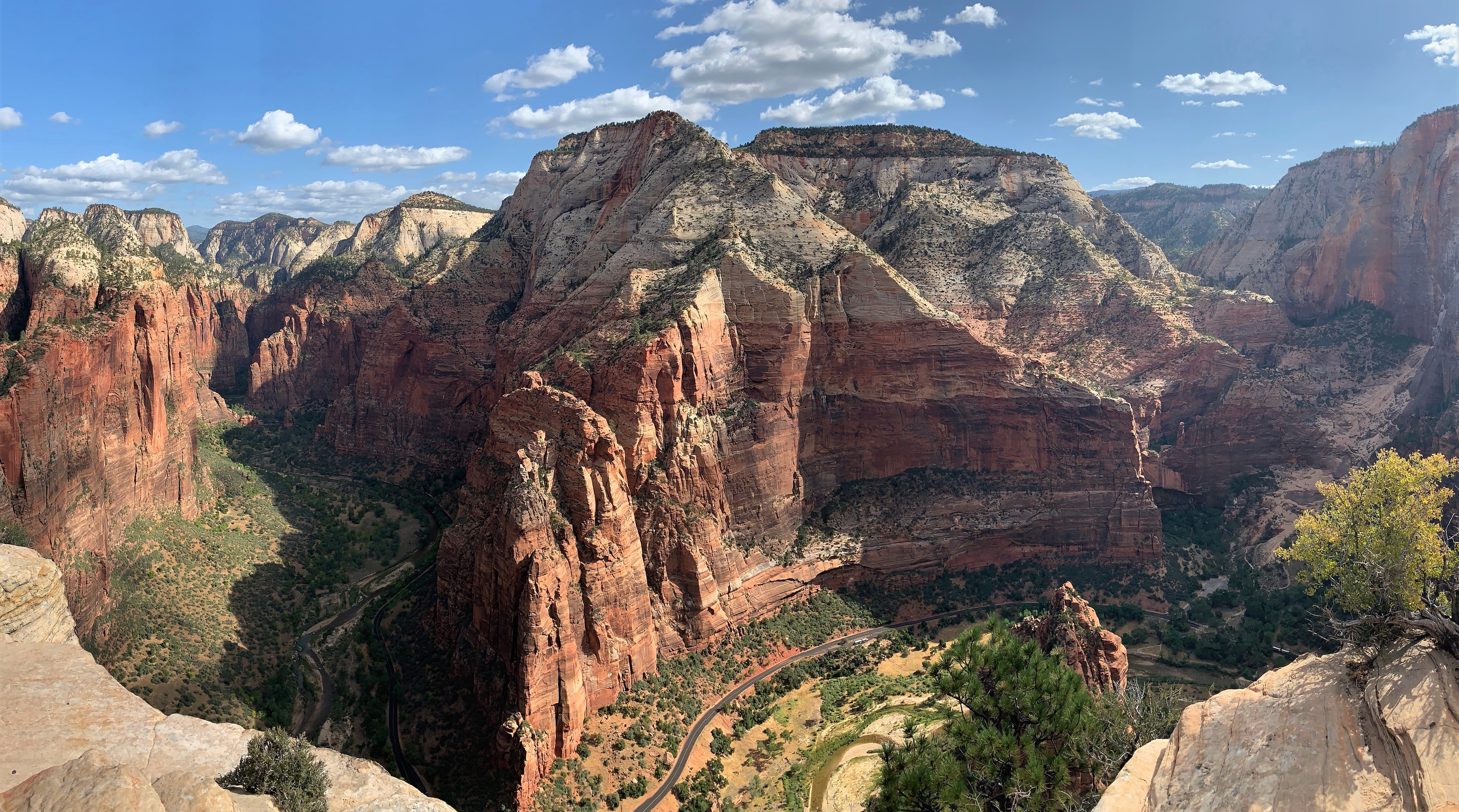
- Observation Point seen from Angels Landing Trail

Highest point
- Elevation: 6,507 ft (1,983 m)
- Parent peak: Observation Benchmark (6708 ft)
- Isolation: 0.12 mi (0.19 km)
- Coordinates: 37°16′42″N 112°56′25″W

Geography
- Location within Utah Location within the United States
- Country: United States
- State: Utah
- County: Washington
- Protected area: Zion National Park
- Parent range: Colorado Plateau
- Topo map: USGS Temple of Sinawava

Geology
- Rock age: Jurassic
- Rock type: Navajo sandstone

Climbing
- Easiest route: class 1 hiking trail

Observation Point is a 6,507-foot (1,983 m) elevation Navajo Sandstone feature located in Zion National Park, in Washington County of southwest Utah, United States. Observation Point is situated at the north end of Zion Canyon, towering 2,100 feet (640 meters) above the canyon floor and the North Fork of the Virgin River which drains precipitation runoff from this viewpoint. A popular 8-mile round-trip trail climbs from the Weeping Rock trailhead along Zion Canyon Road to reach the top. Due to a major rockfall from Cable Mountain, which has destroyed the lower part of this trail, the Observation Point is currently only accessible from the East Mesa or Stave Spring trailhead. Neighbors visible from the point include The Great White Throne, Cathedral Mountain, Angels Landing, and Cable Mountain. This geographical feature's name was officially adopted in 1934 by the U.S. Board on Geographic Names.

== Climate ==
Spring and fall are the most favorable seasons to visit Observation Point. According to the Köppen climate classification system, it is located in a Cold semi-arid climate zone, which is defined by the coldest month having an average mean temperature below 32 °F (0 °C), and at least 50% of the total annual precipitation being received during the spring and summer. This desert climate receives less than 10 inches (250 millimeters) of annual rainfall, and snowfall is generally light during the winter.

== Gallery ==
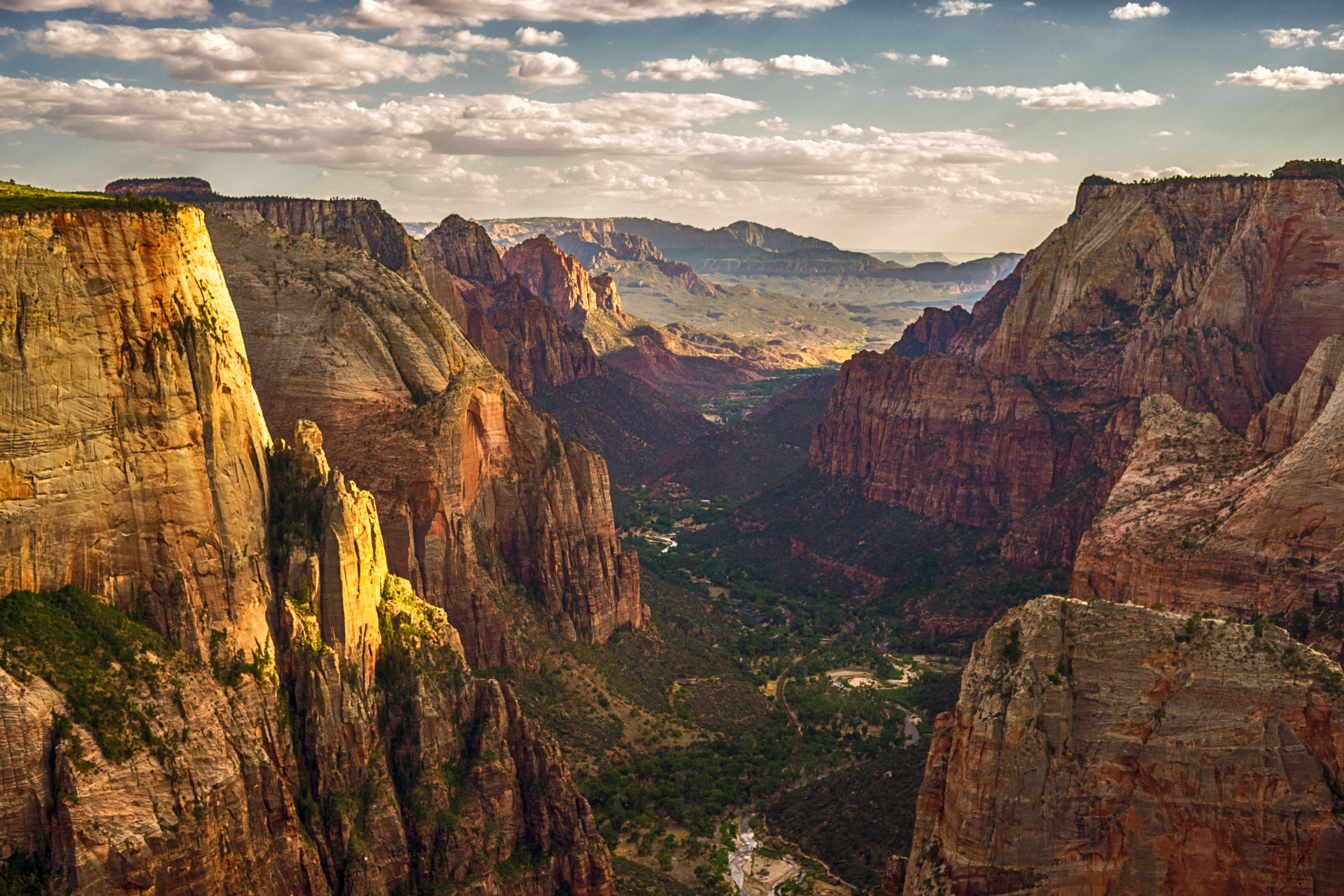
View from Observation Point looking southwest down Zion Canyon

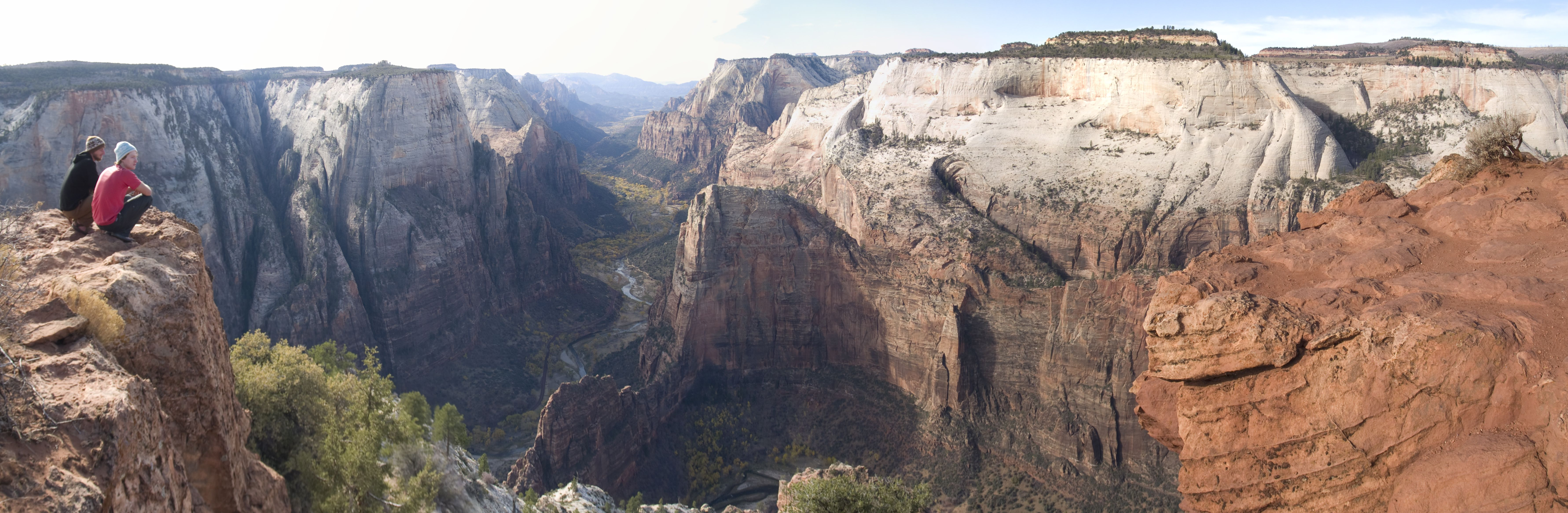
Enjoying the view from Observation Point, white cliffs of Cathedral Mountain to right

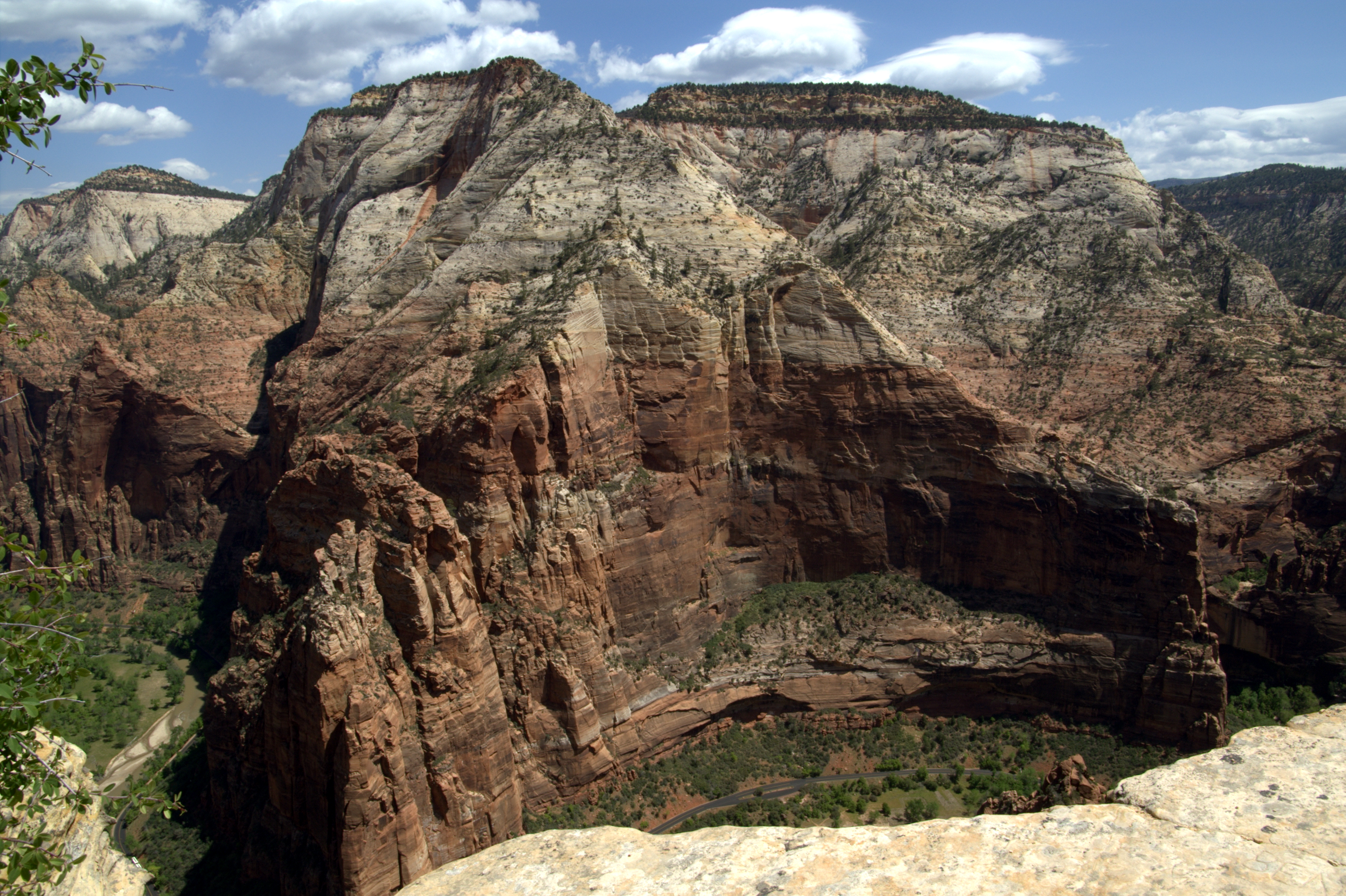
Observation Point from Angels Landing

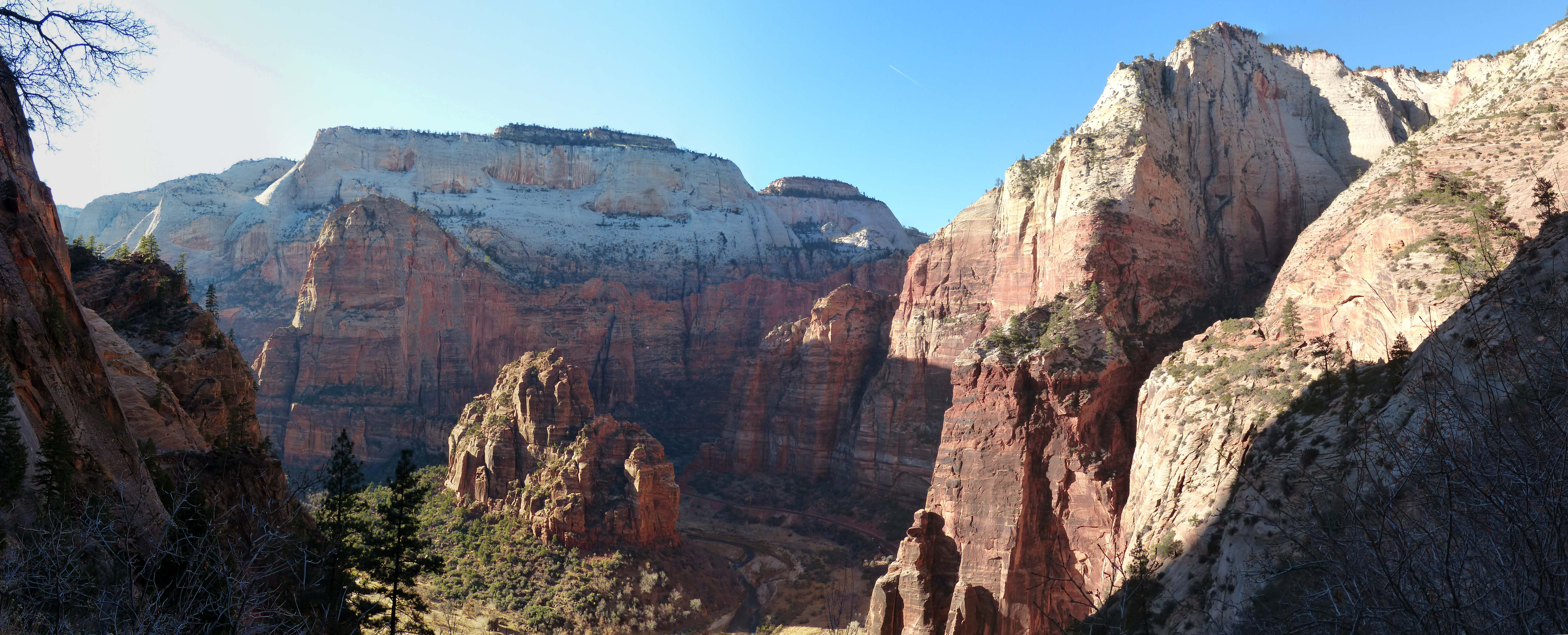
Cathedral Mountain (left) from the trail, with Observation Point upper right

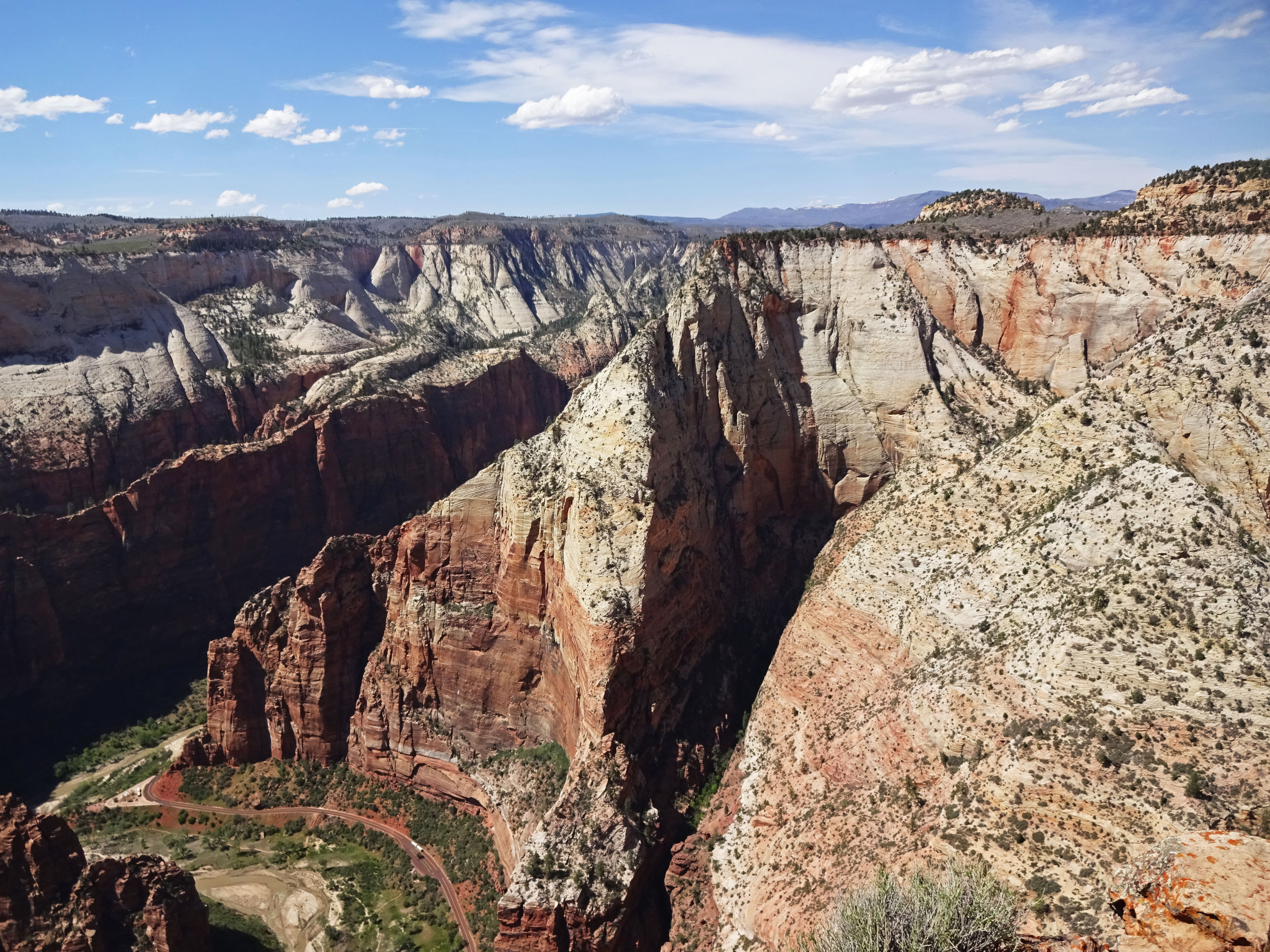
Observation Point from Cable Mountain

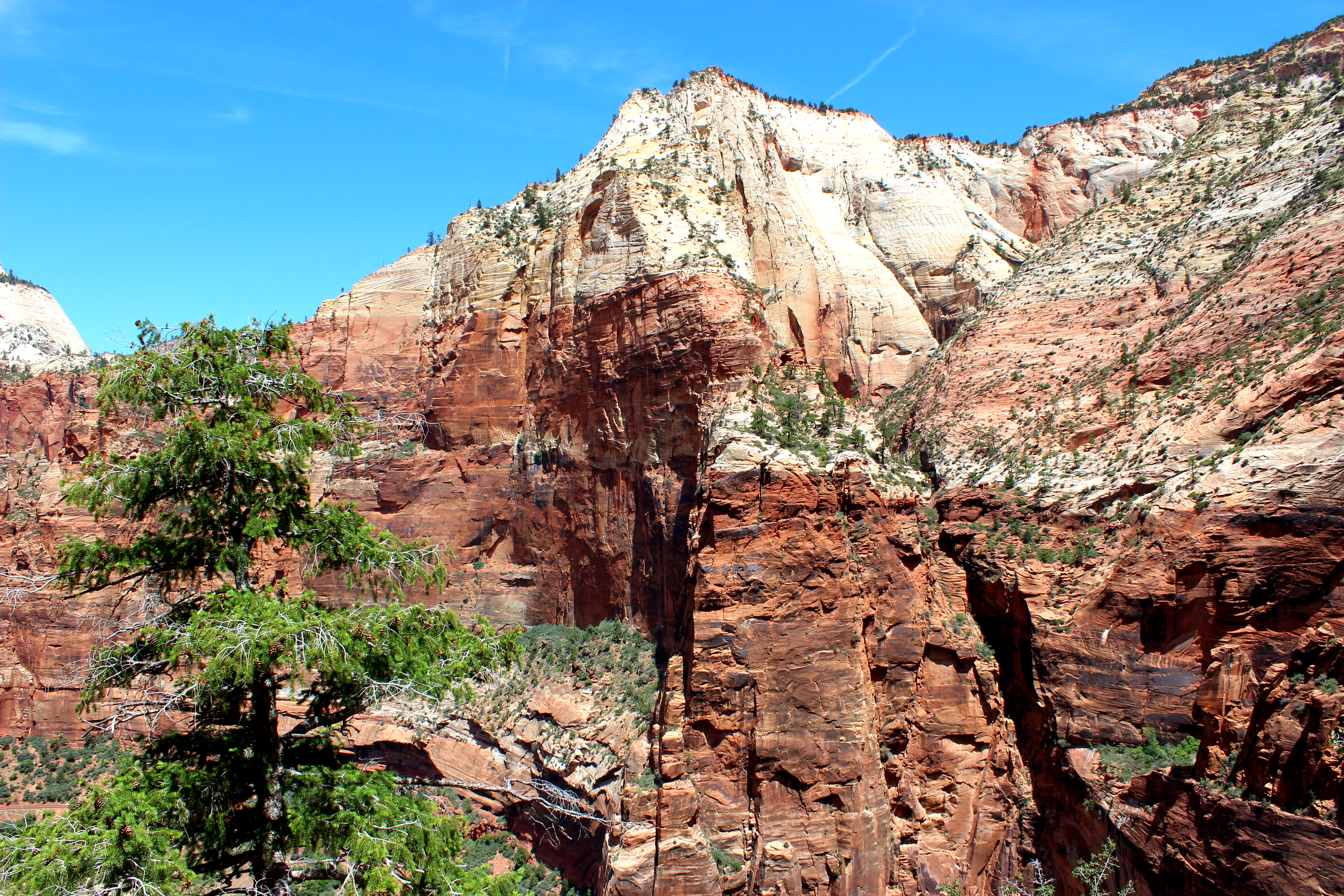
Observation Point from southeast

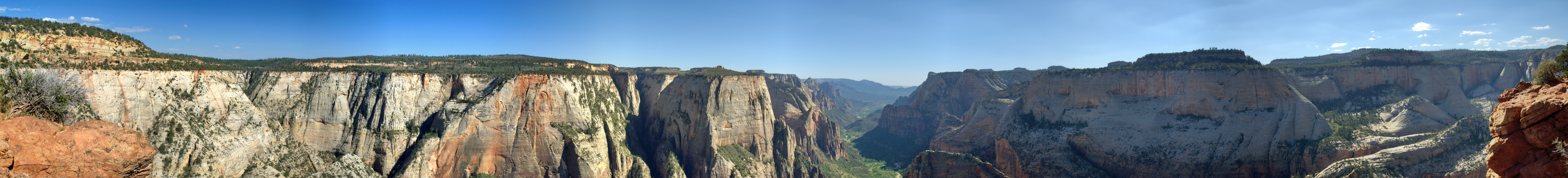
Panoramic view from Observation Point

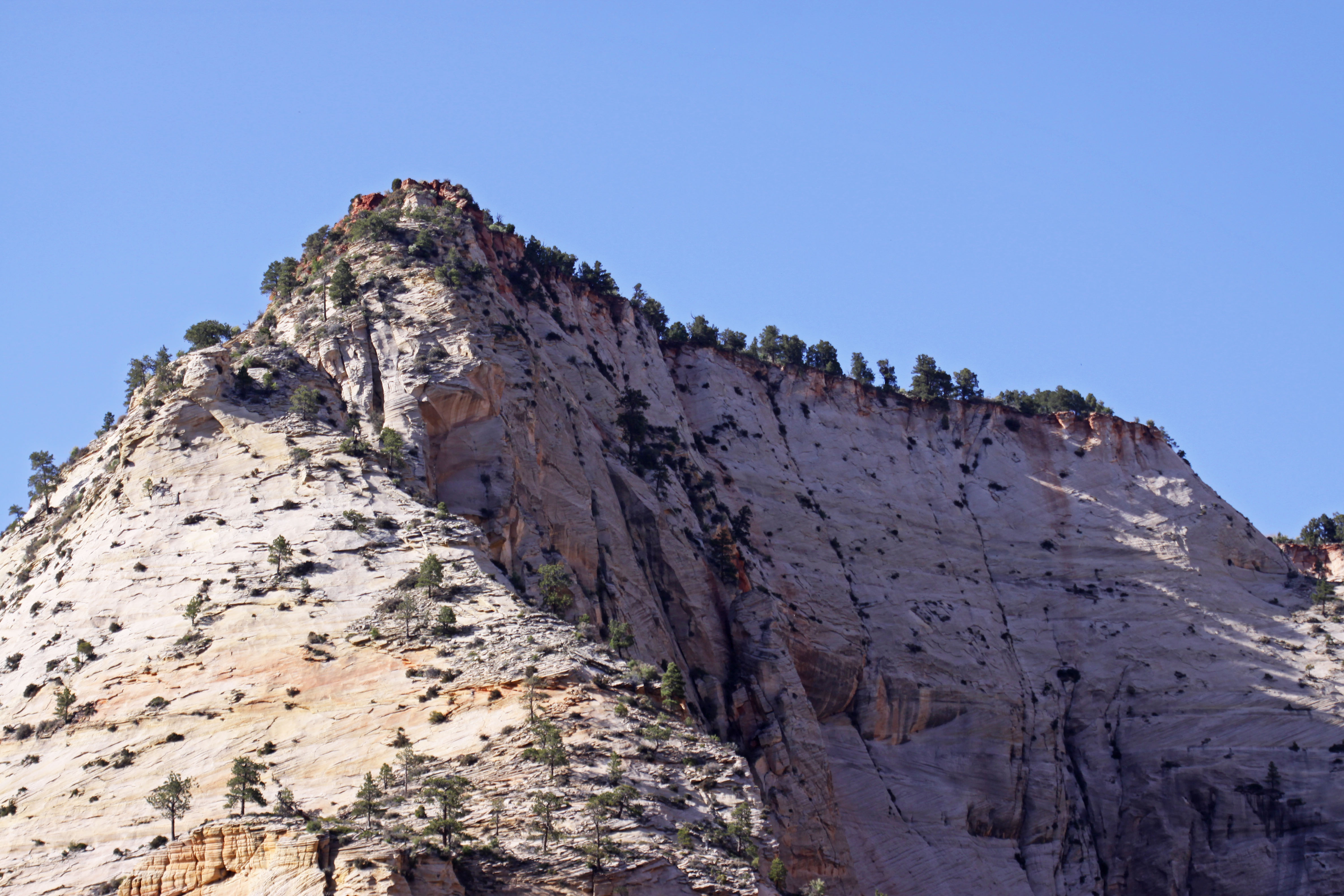
Observation Point detail

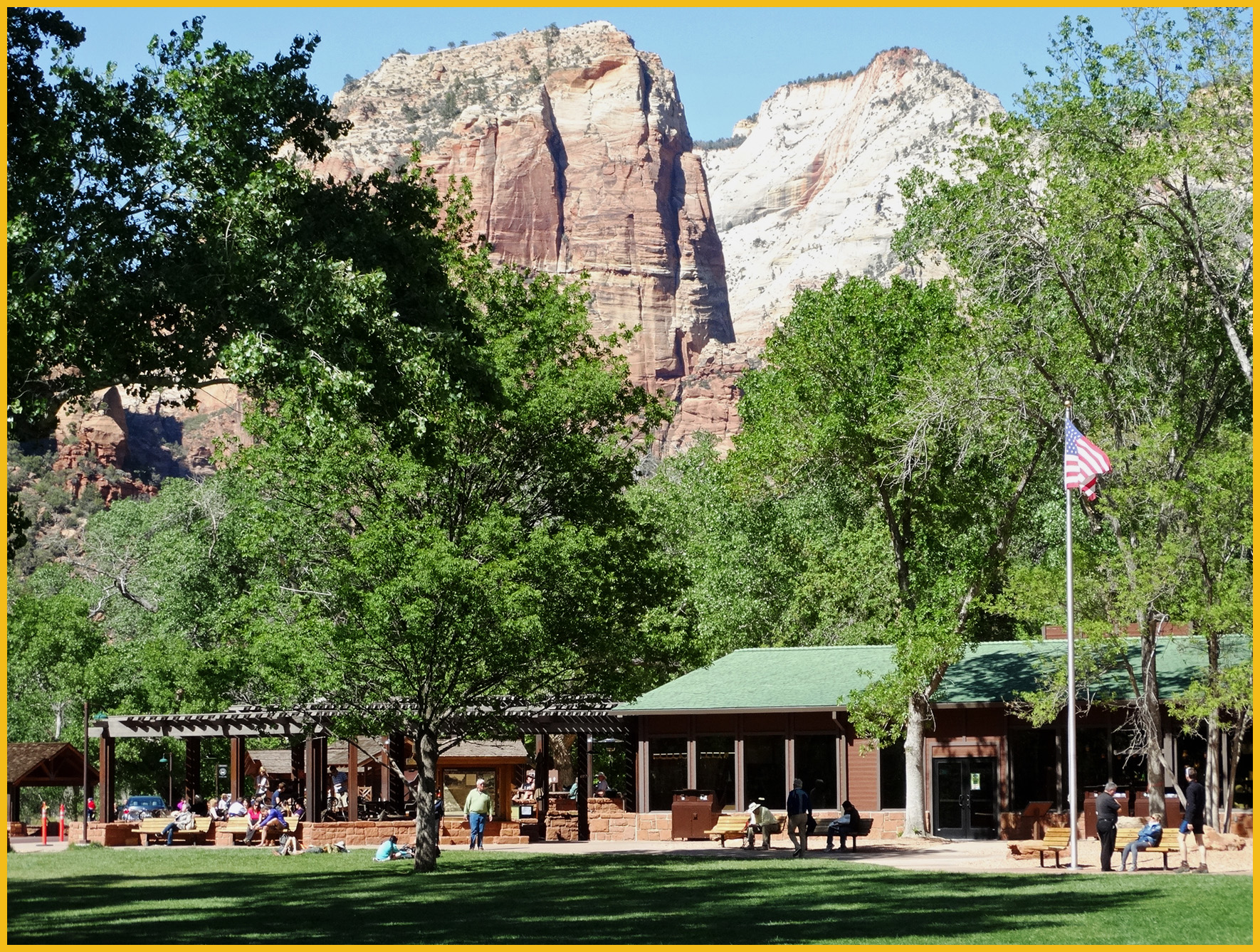
Angels Landing and Observation Point from Zion Lodge

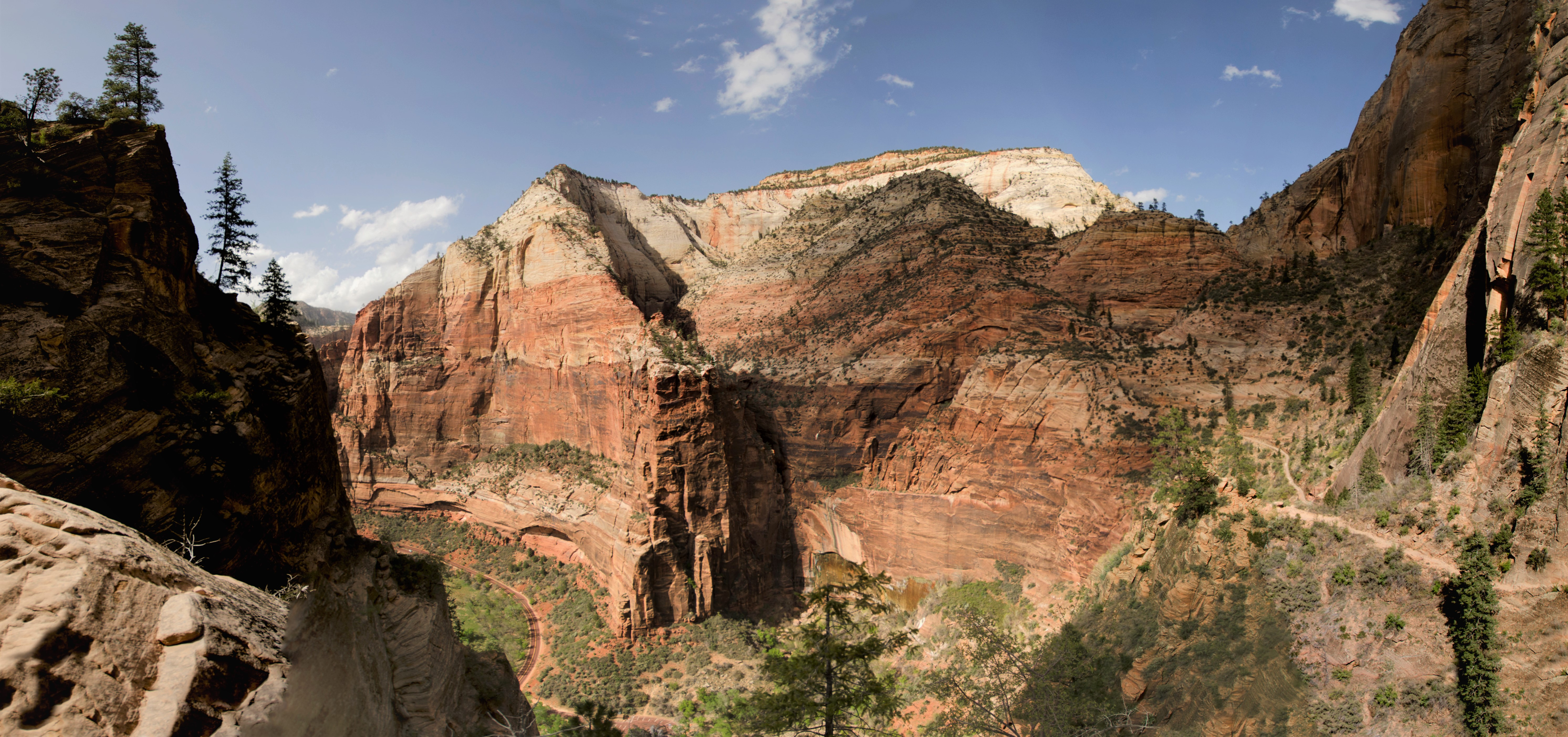
Observation Point left of center

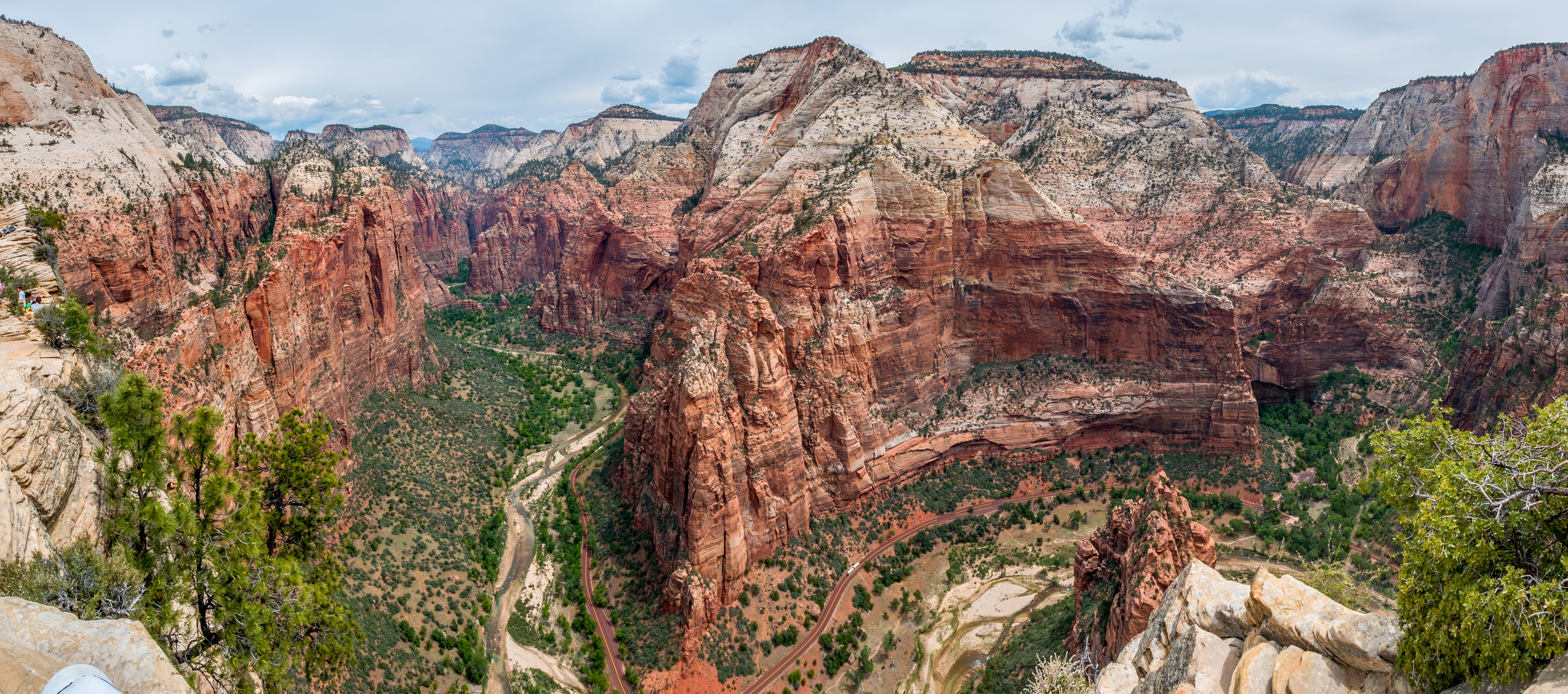
Observation Point seen from Angels Landing

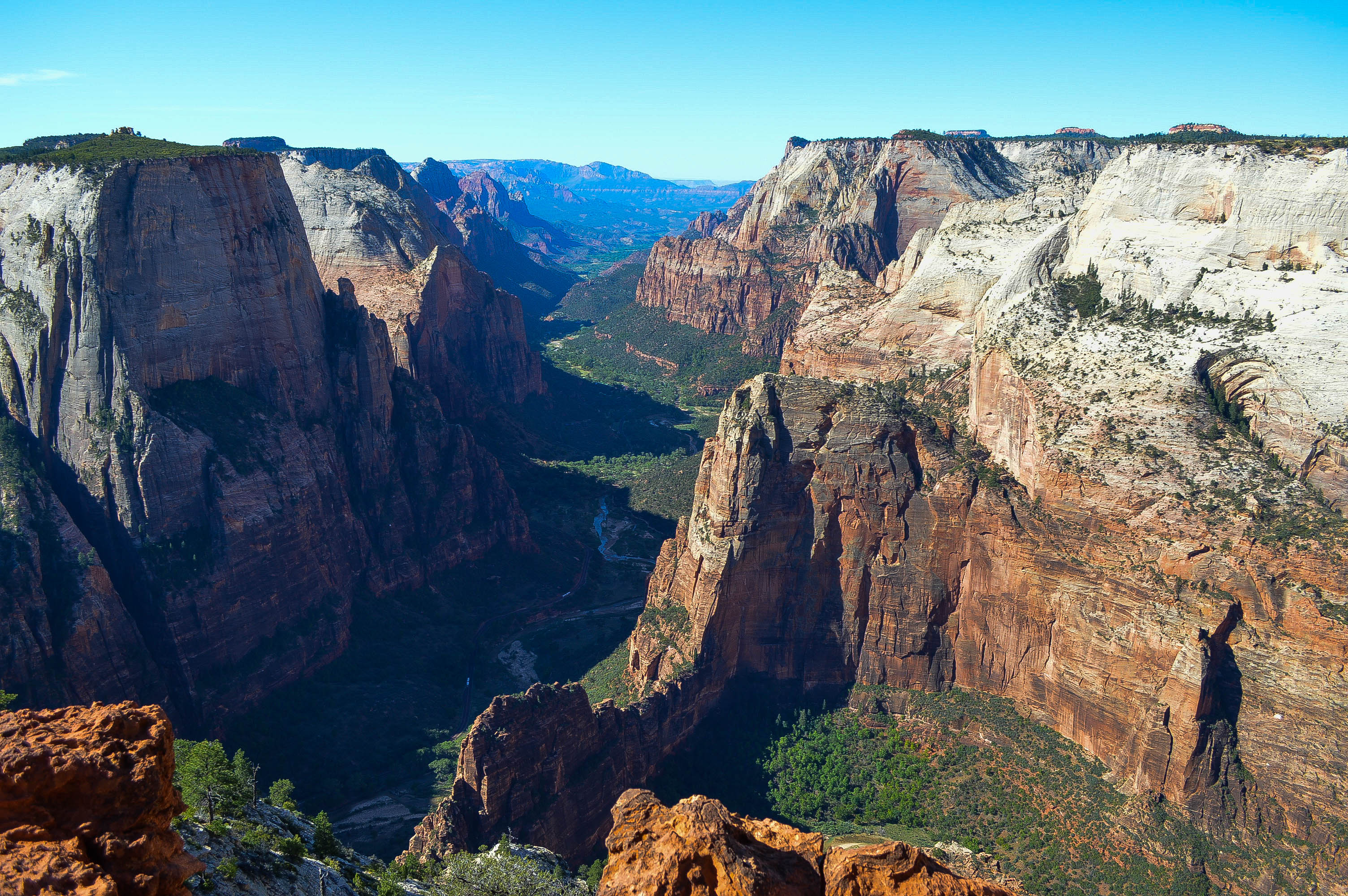
Clockwise from top: Lady Mountain, Cathedral Mountain, Angels Landing, The Organ, The Great White Throne, Red Arch Mountain.

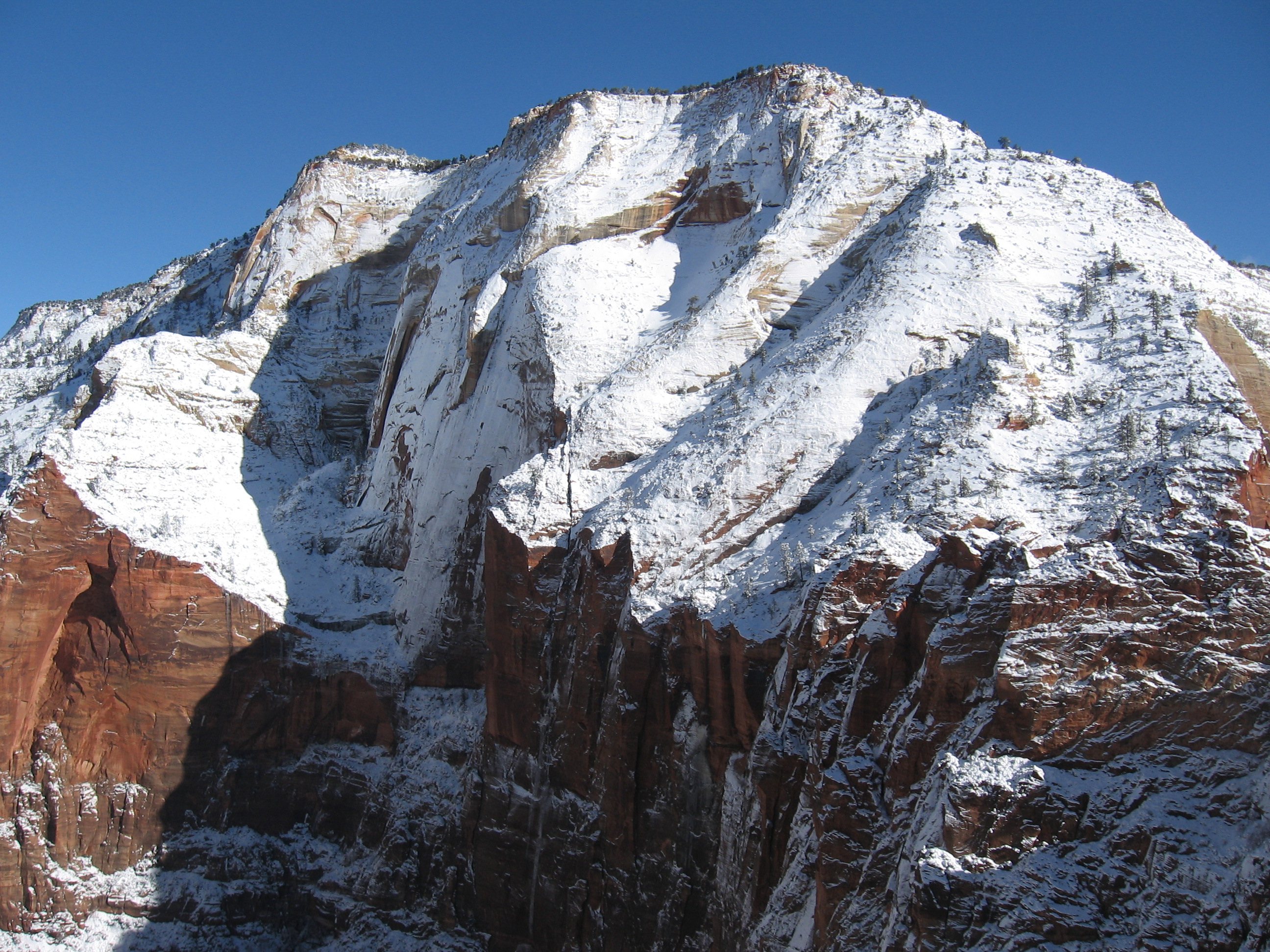
Observation Point covered with winter snow

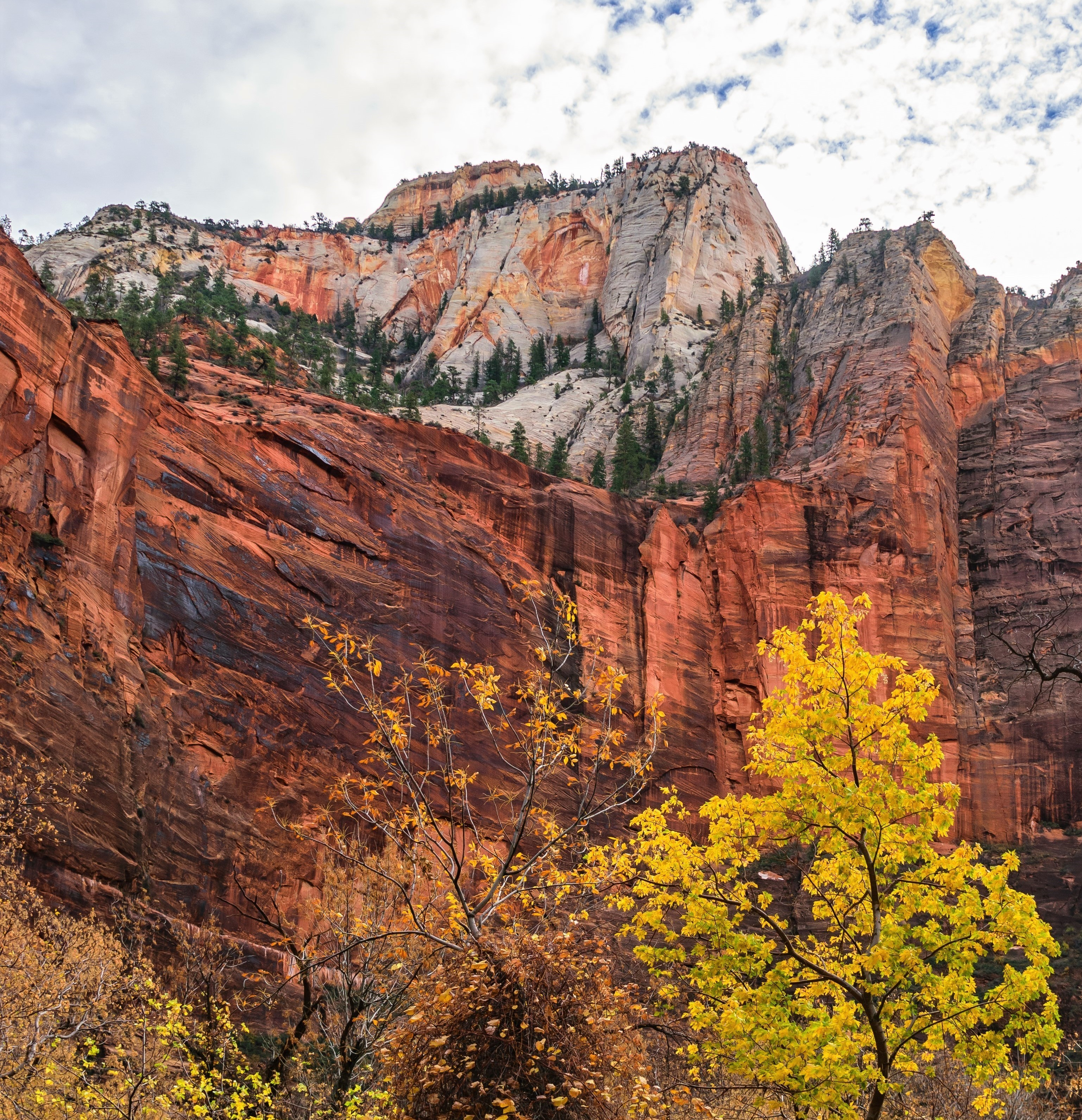
Observation Benchmark seen from Temple of Sinawava

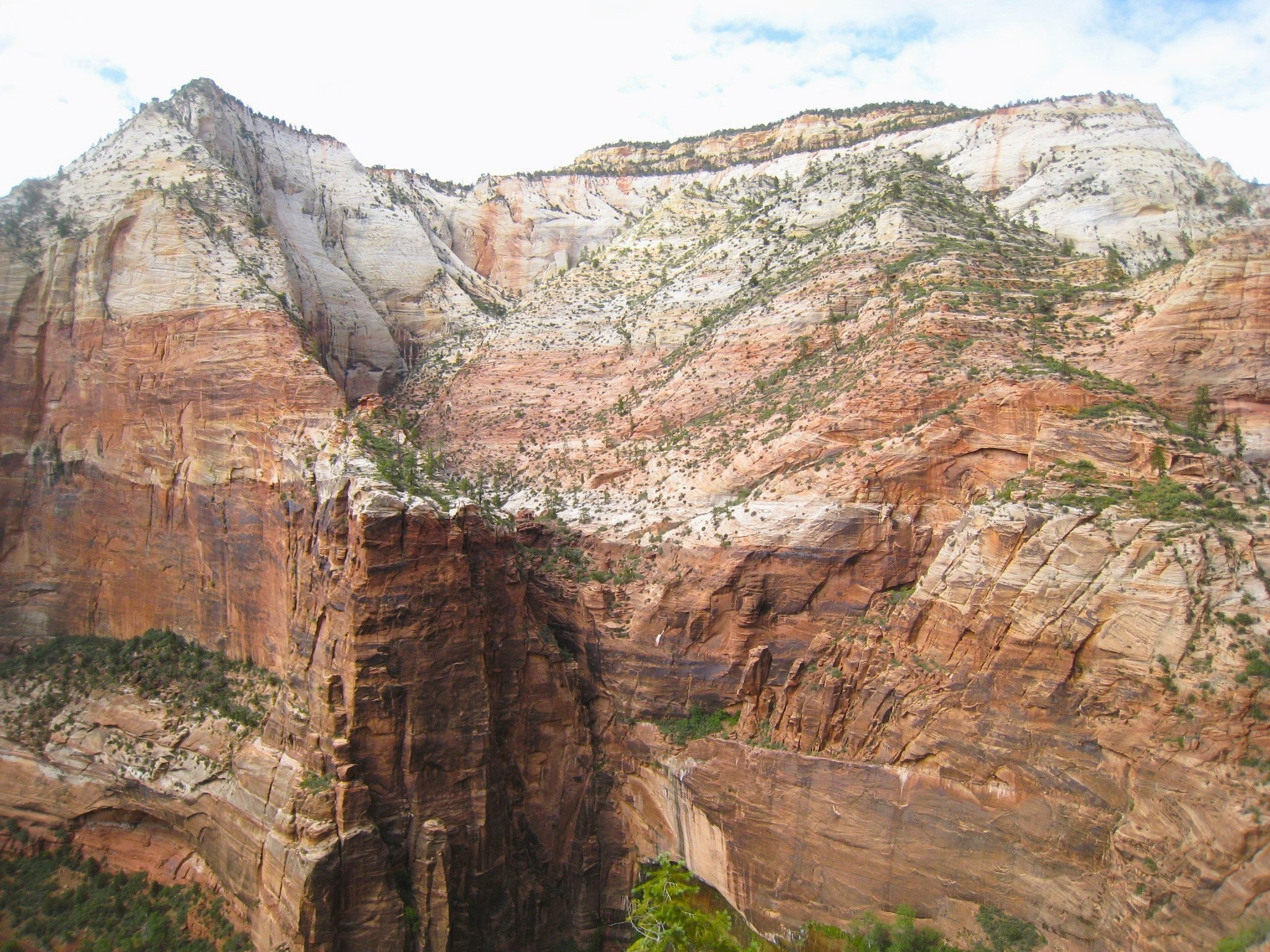
Observation Point to left

== See also ==
- Geology of the Zion and Kolob canyons area
- Colorado Plateau
