= The Organ (Zion National Park) =

Mountain in Zion National Park, Utah, United States

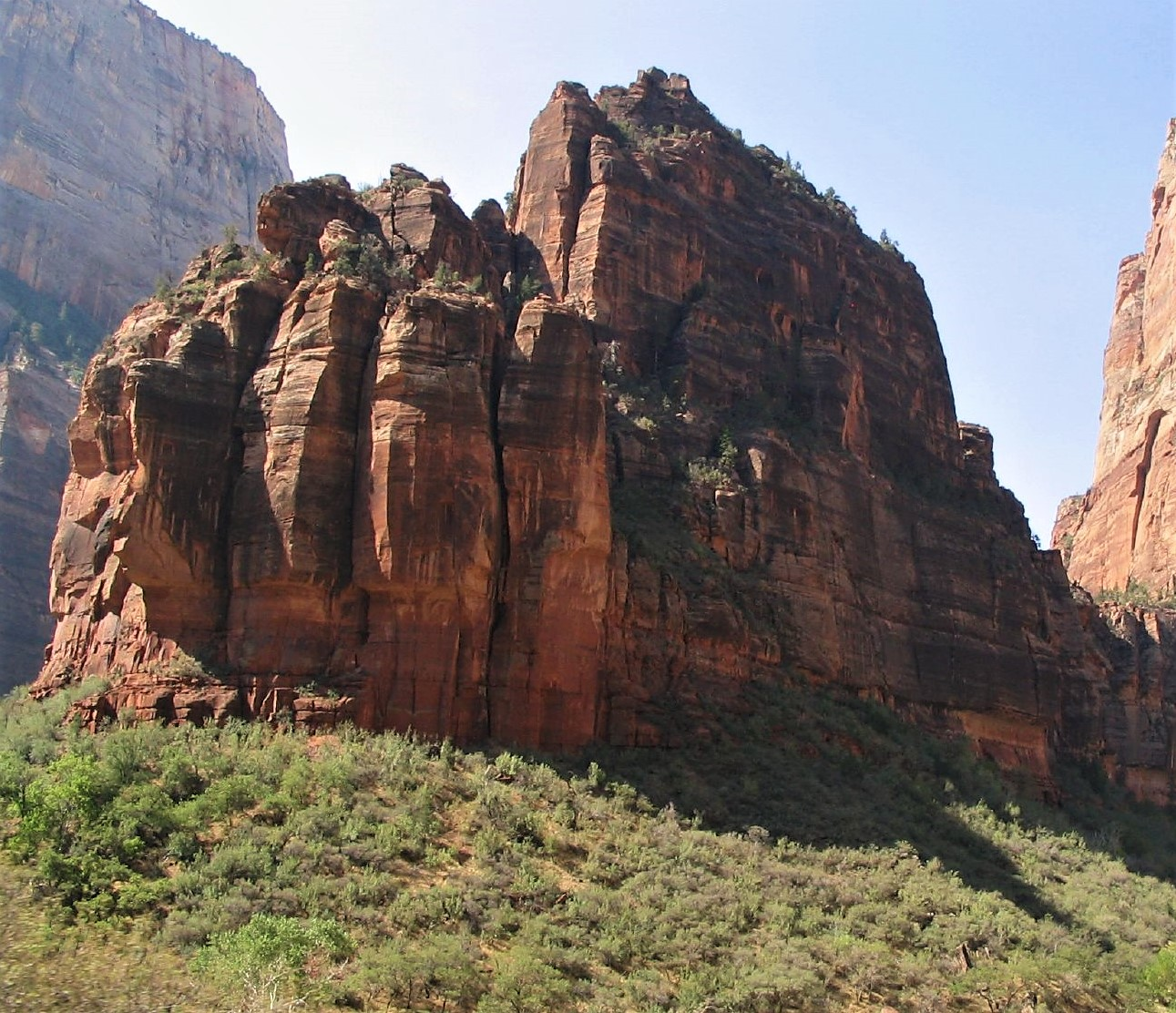
- The Organ seen from the north

Highest point
- Elevation: 5,080 ft (1,550 m)
- Prominence: 320 ft (98 m)
- Parent peak: Angels Landing (5,790 ft)
- Isolation: 0.25 mi (0.40 km)
- Coordinates: 37°16′15″N 112°56′37″W

Geography
- Location within Utah Location within the United States
- Country: United States
- State: Utah
- County: Washington
- Protected area: Zion National Park
- Parent range: Colorado Plateau
- Topo map: USGS Temple of Sinawava

Geology
- Rock age: Jurassic
- Rock type: Navajo sandstone

Climbing
- Easiest route: class 5.6 climbing

The Organ is a 5,080-foot (1,550 m) elevation Navajo Sandstone summit located in Zion National Park, in Washington County of southwest Utah, United States. The Organ is situated in the Big Bend at the north end of Zion Canyon, rising 700 feet (210 meters) above the canyon floor and the North Fork of the Virgin River which drains precipitation runoff from this rock. Neighbors include The Great White Throne, Cathedral Mountain, Angels Landing, Observation Point, and Cable Mountain. The Organ is believed to have been named by Claud Hirschi and Ethelbert Bingham, residents of Rockville, on their 1916 trip with Methodist Minister Frederick Vining Fisher, who also named geographical formations in Zion. This geographical feature's descriptive name was officially adopted in 1934 by the U.S. Board on Geographic Names.

== Climate ==
Spring and fall are the most favorable seasons to visit The Organ. According to the Köppen climate classification system, it is located in a Cold semi-arid climate zone, which is defined by the coldest month having an average mean temperature below 32 °F (0 °C), and at least 50% of the total annual precipitation being received during the spring and summer. This desert climate receives less than 10 inches (250 millimeters) of annual rainfall, and snowfall is generally light during the winter.

== Gallery ==
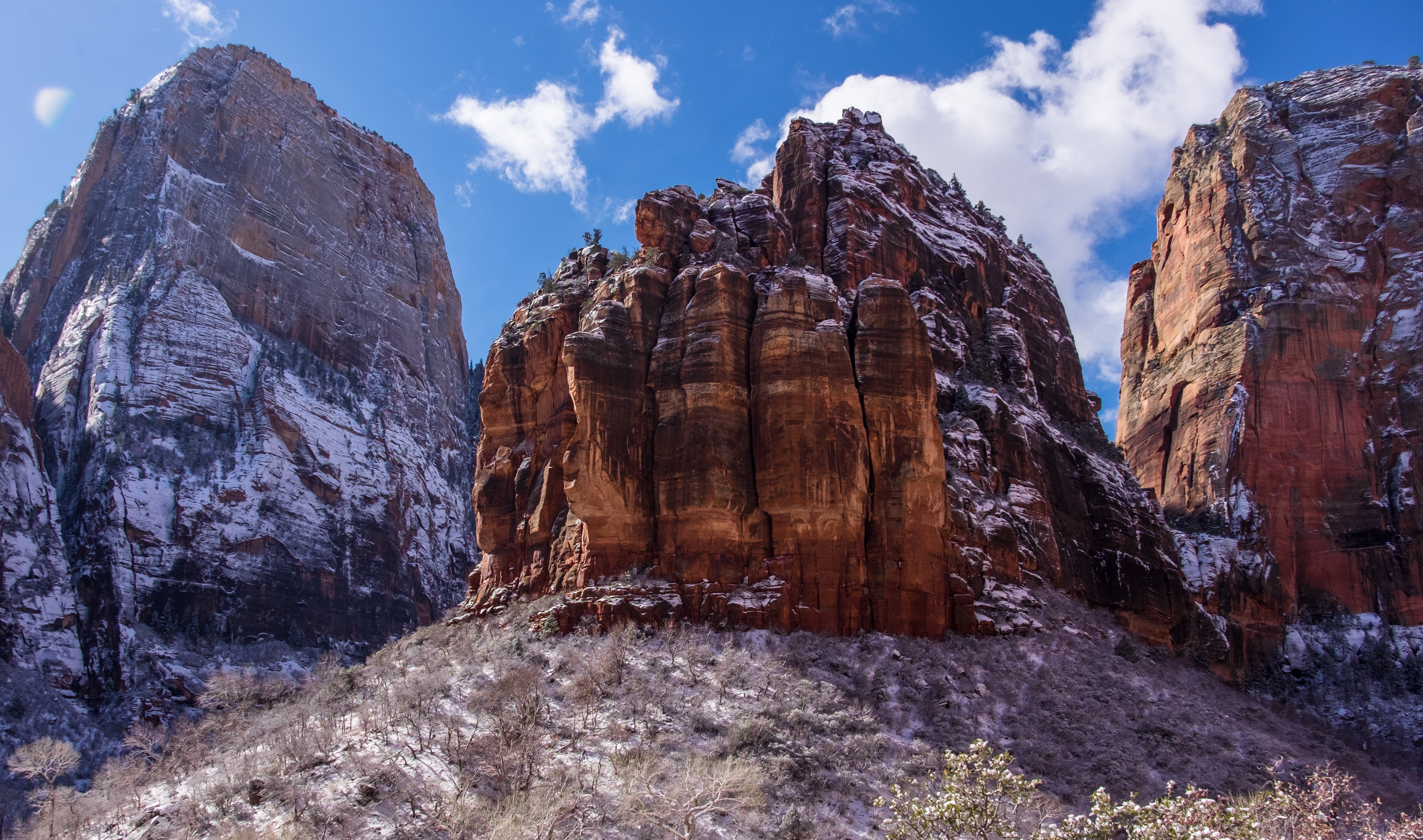
The Organ centered. The Great White Throne (left)

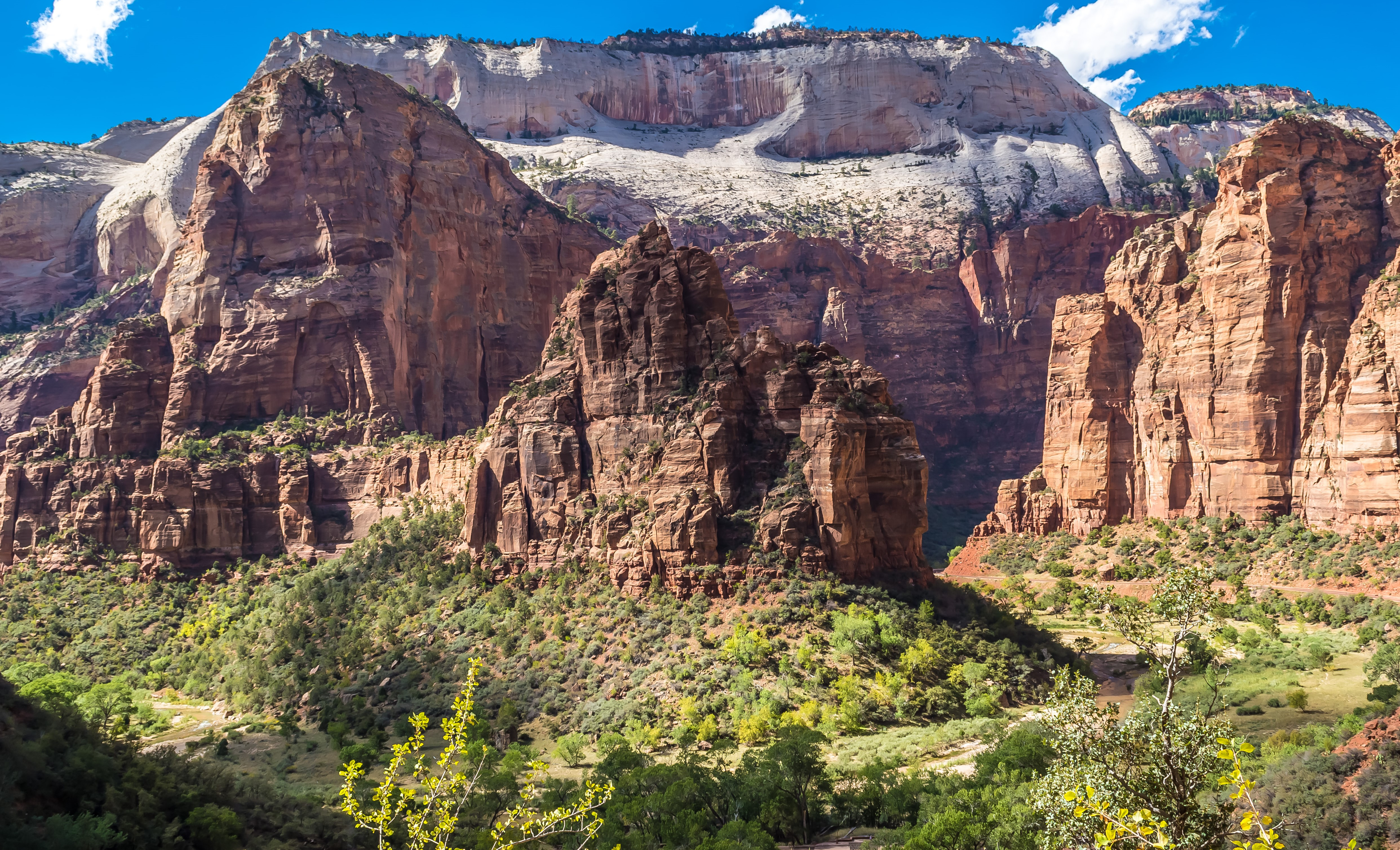
View from the Observation Point Trail, The Organ centered

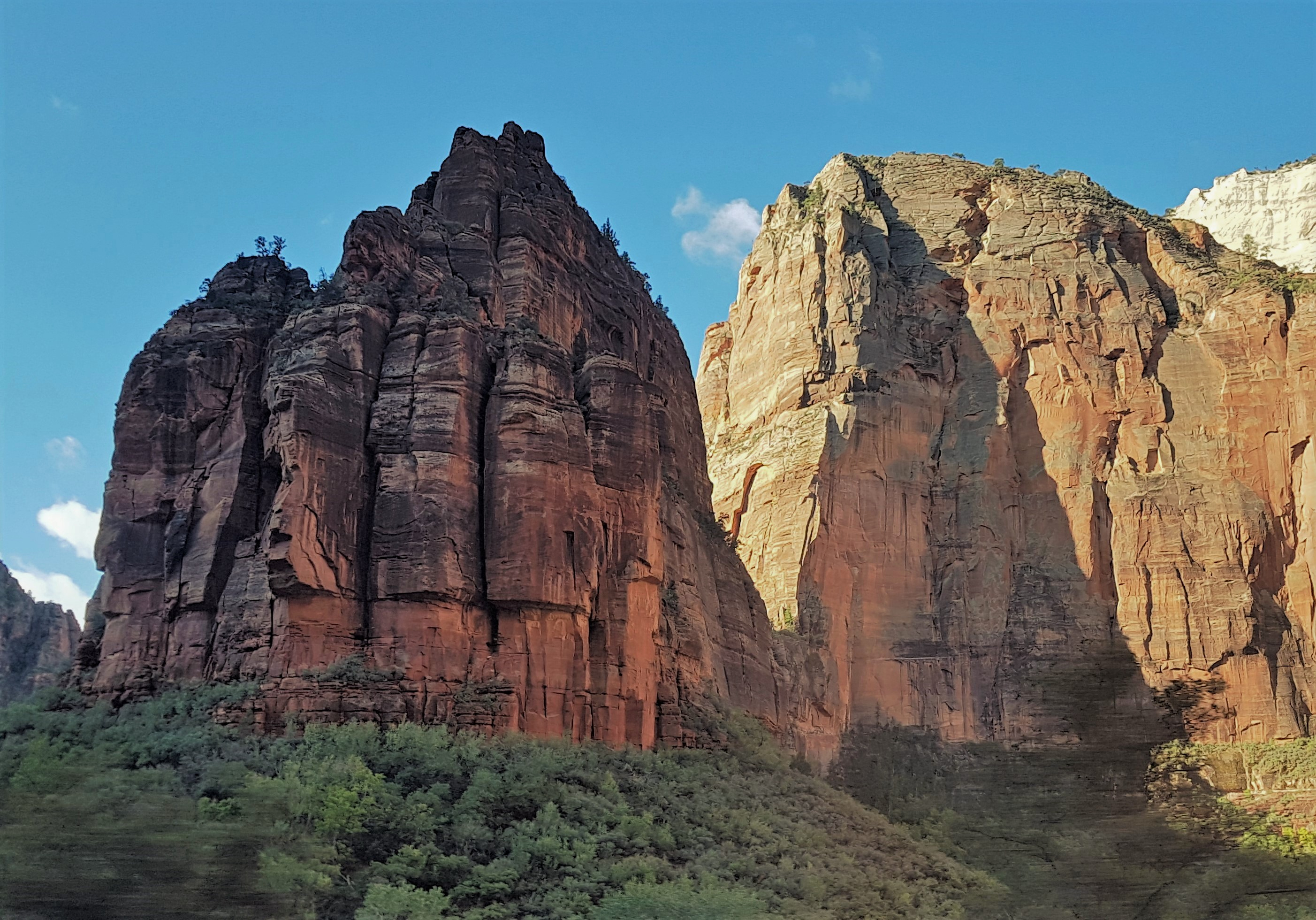
The Organ (left), Angels Landing (right)

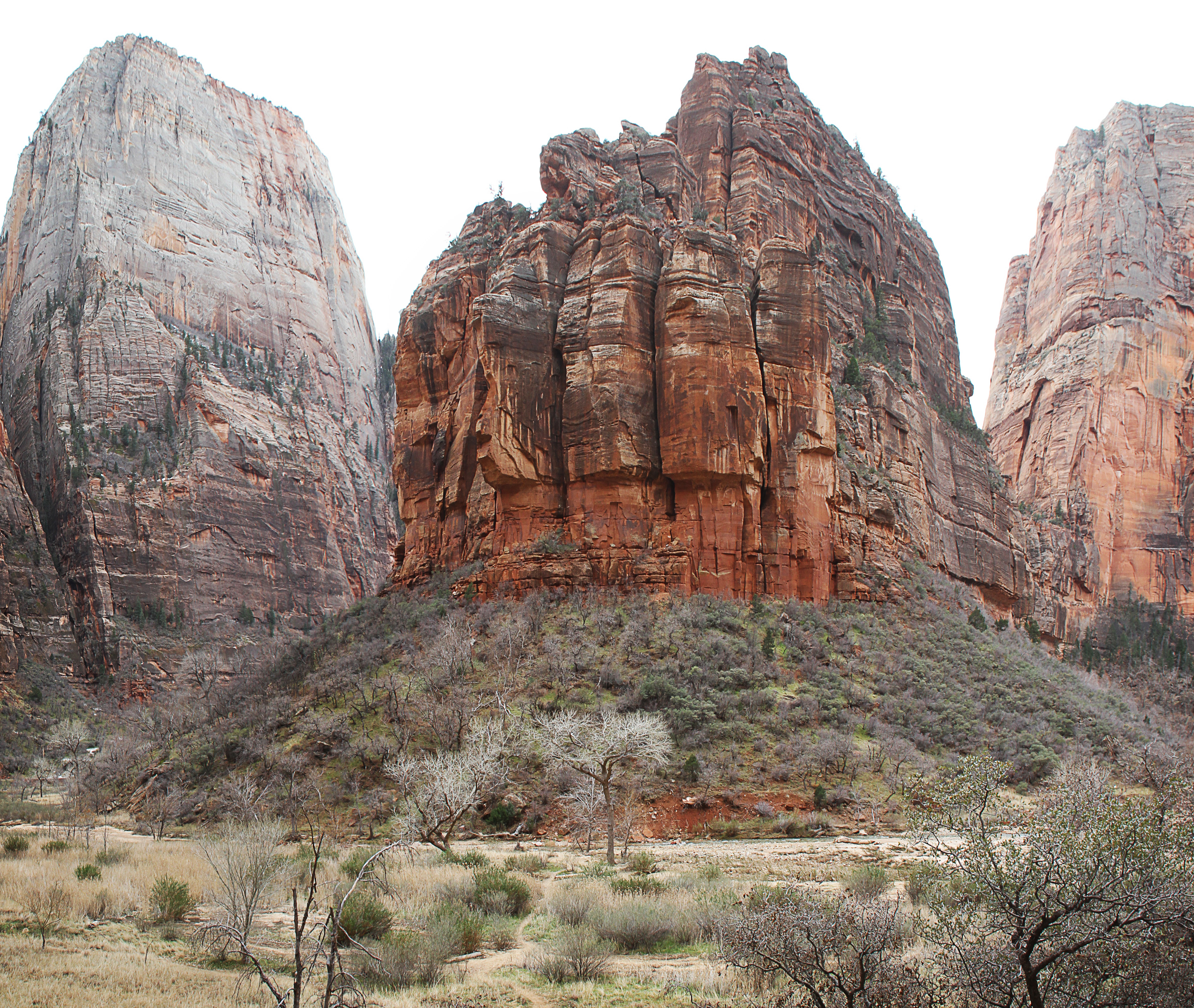
The Organ

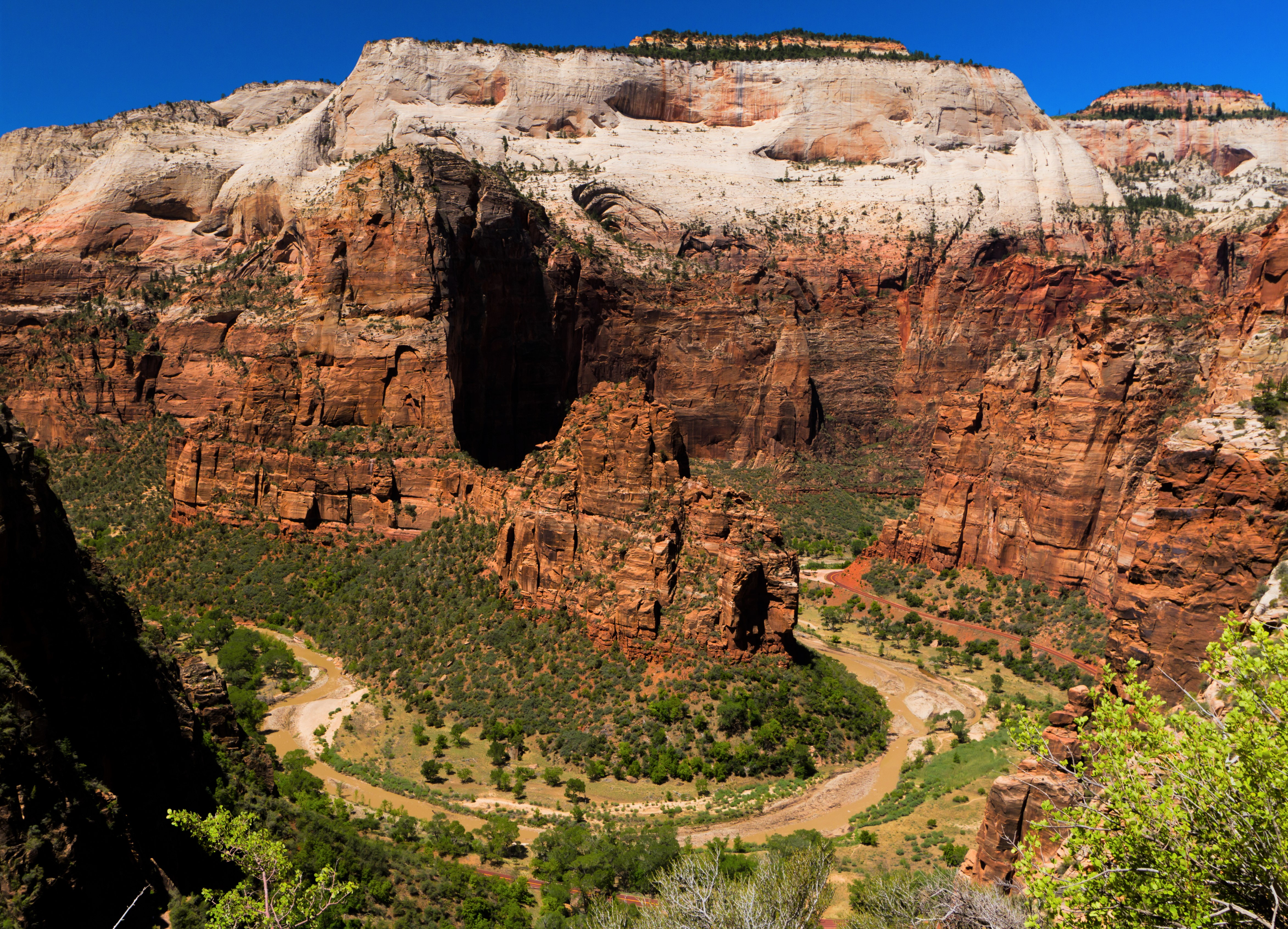
The Organ in bullseye

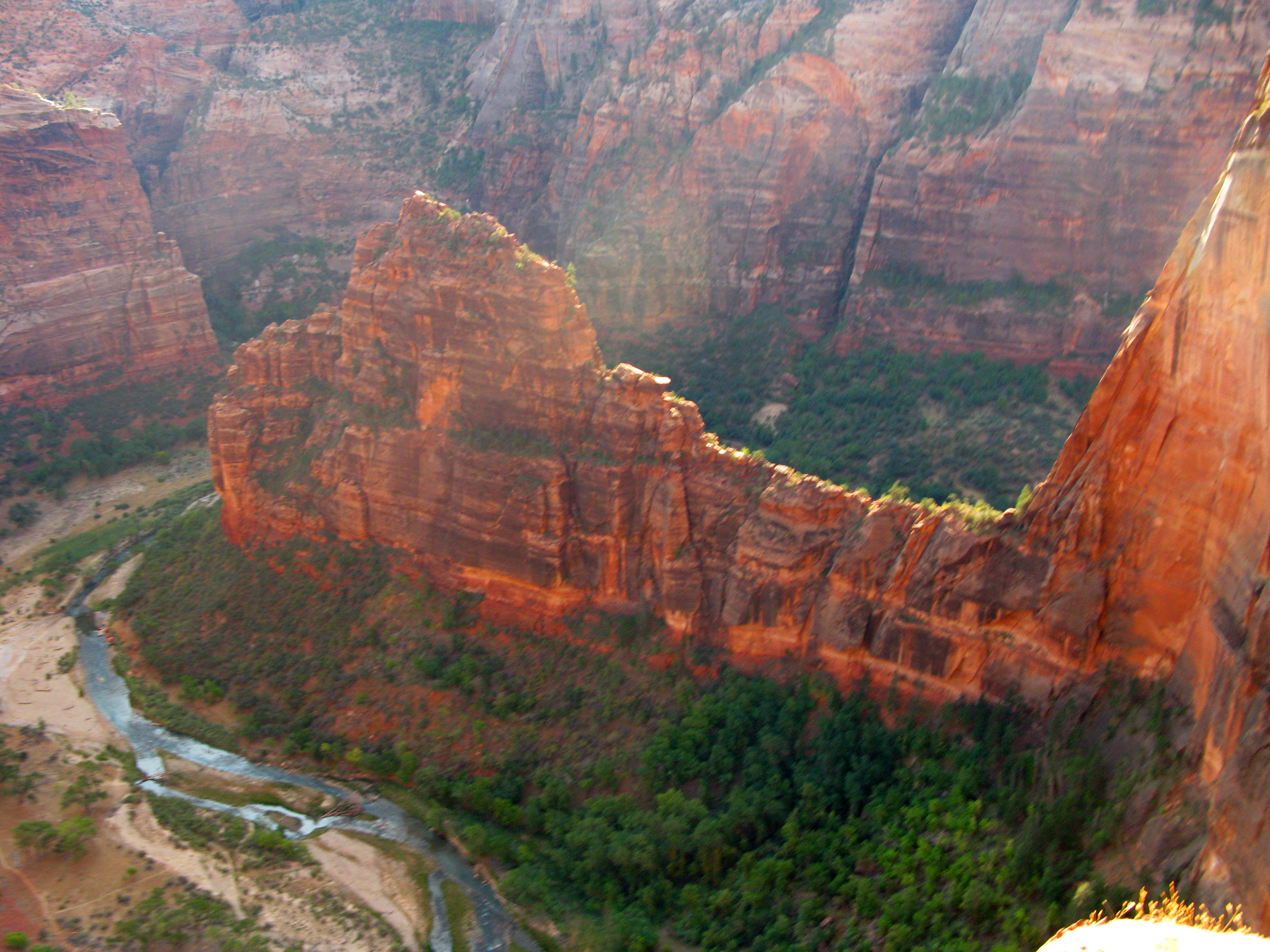
The Organ seen from Angels Landing trail

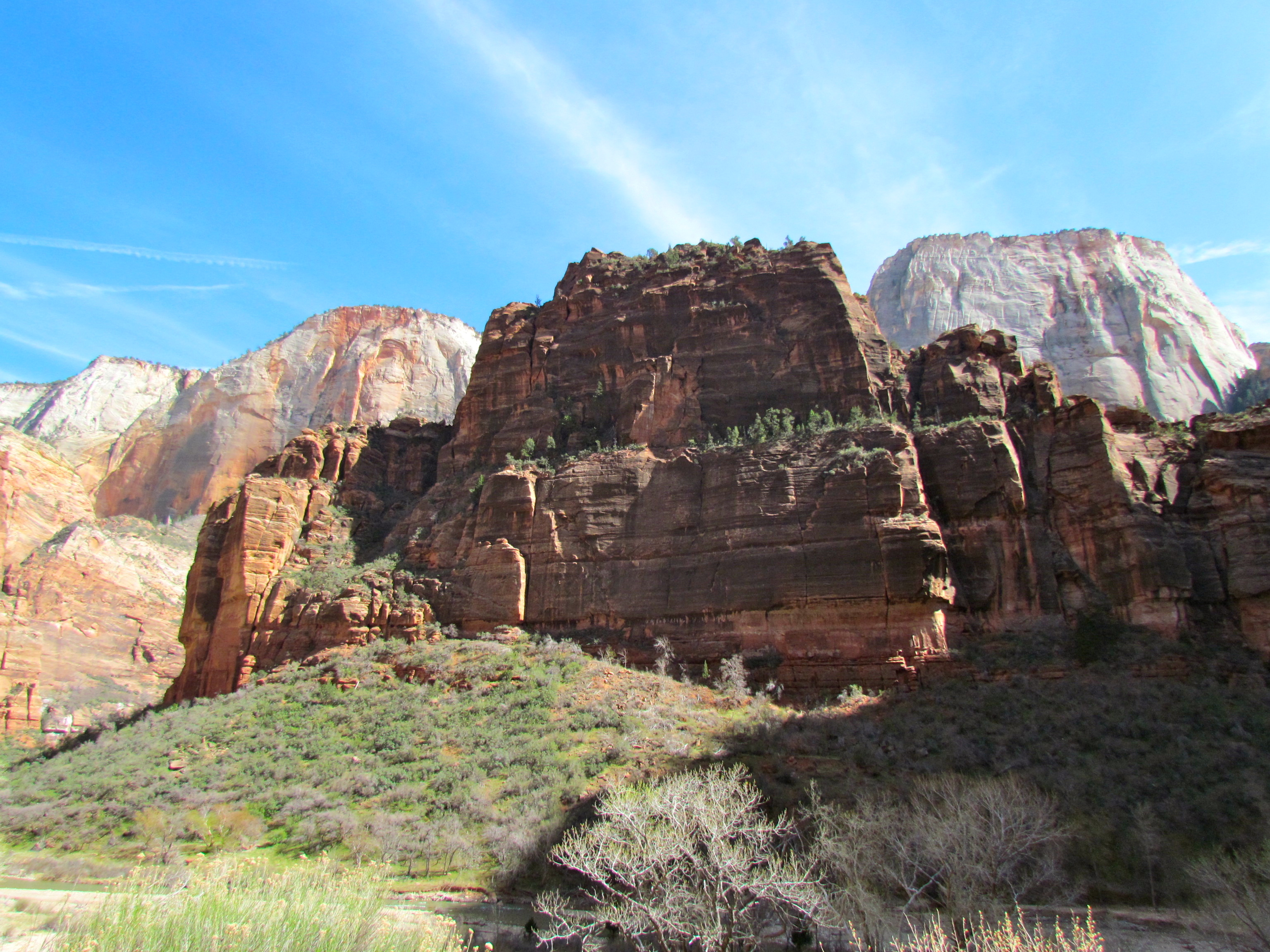
The Organ centered. Cable Mountain left, The Great White Throne right

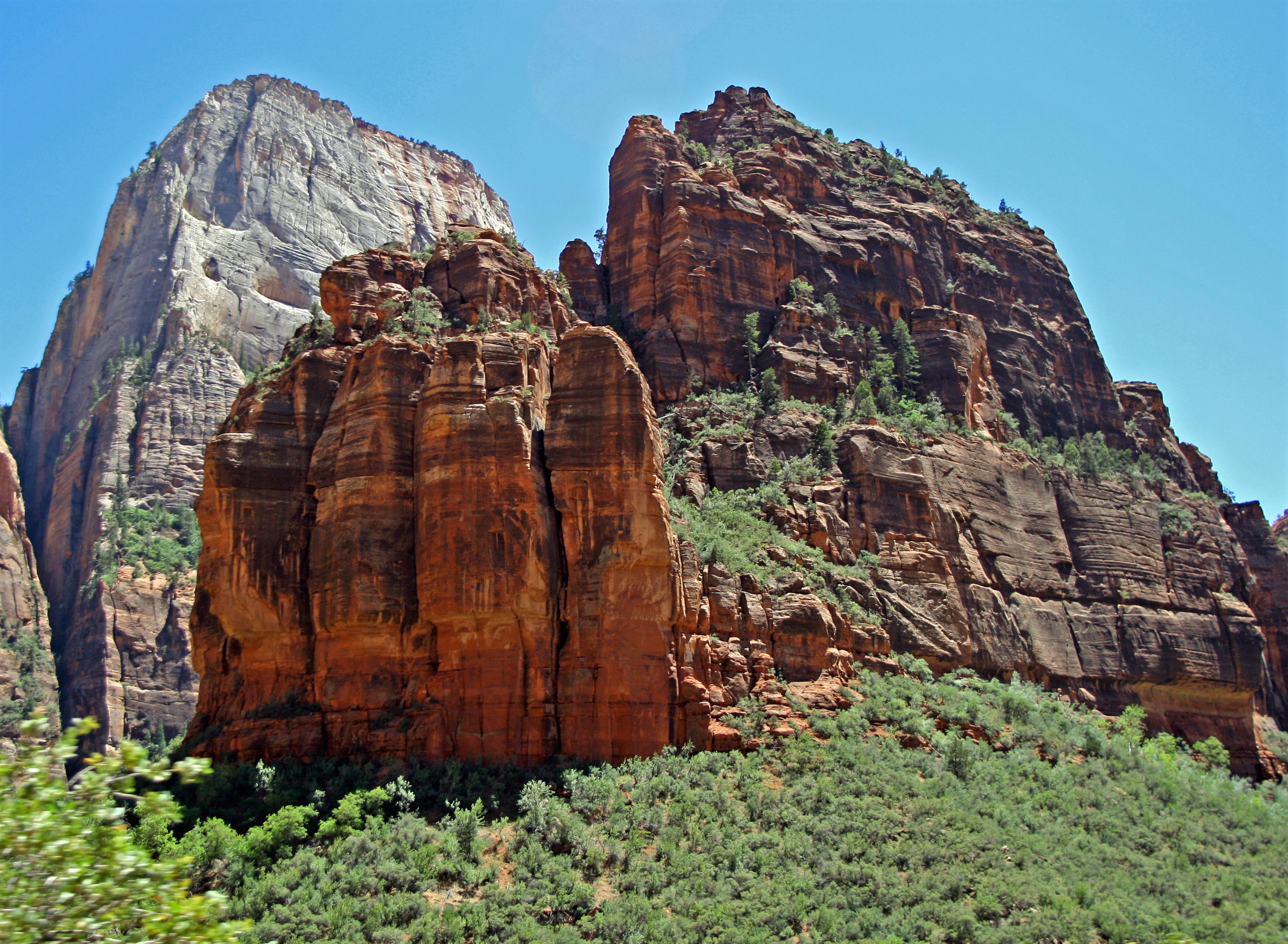
The Organ centered. The Great White Throne (upper left)

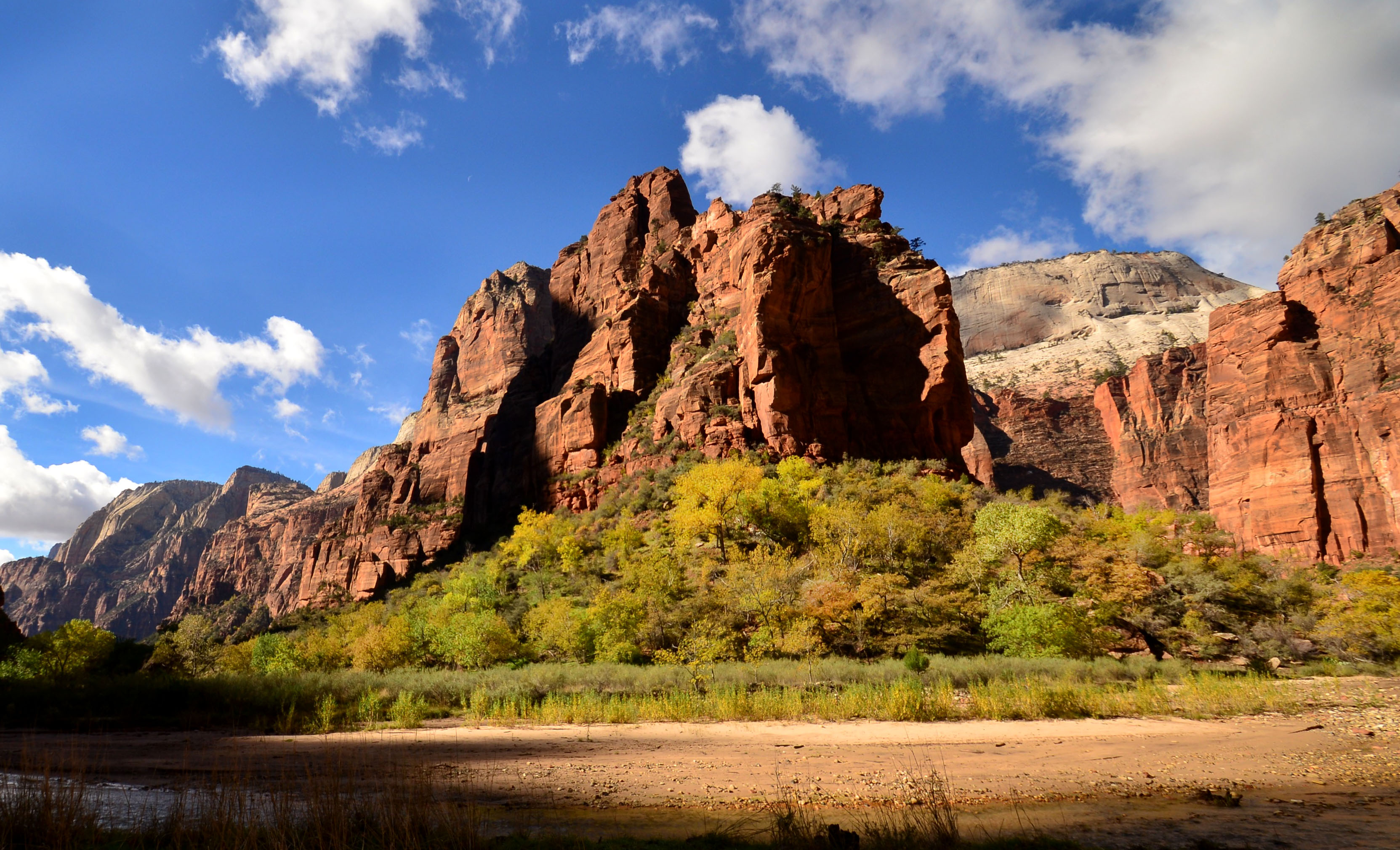
East aspect

== See also ==
- Geology of the Zion and Kolob canyons area
- Colorado Plateau
