= Cable Mountain =

Mountain in the American state of Utah

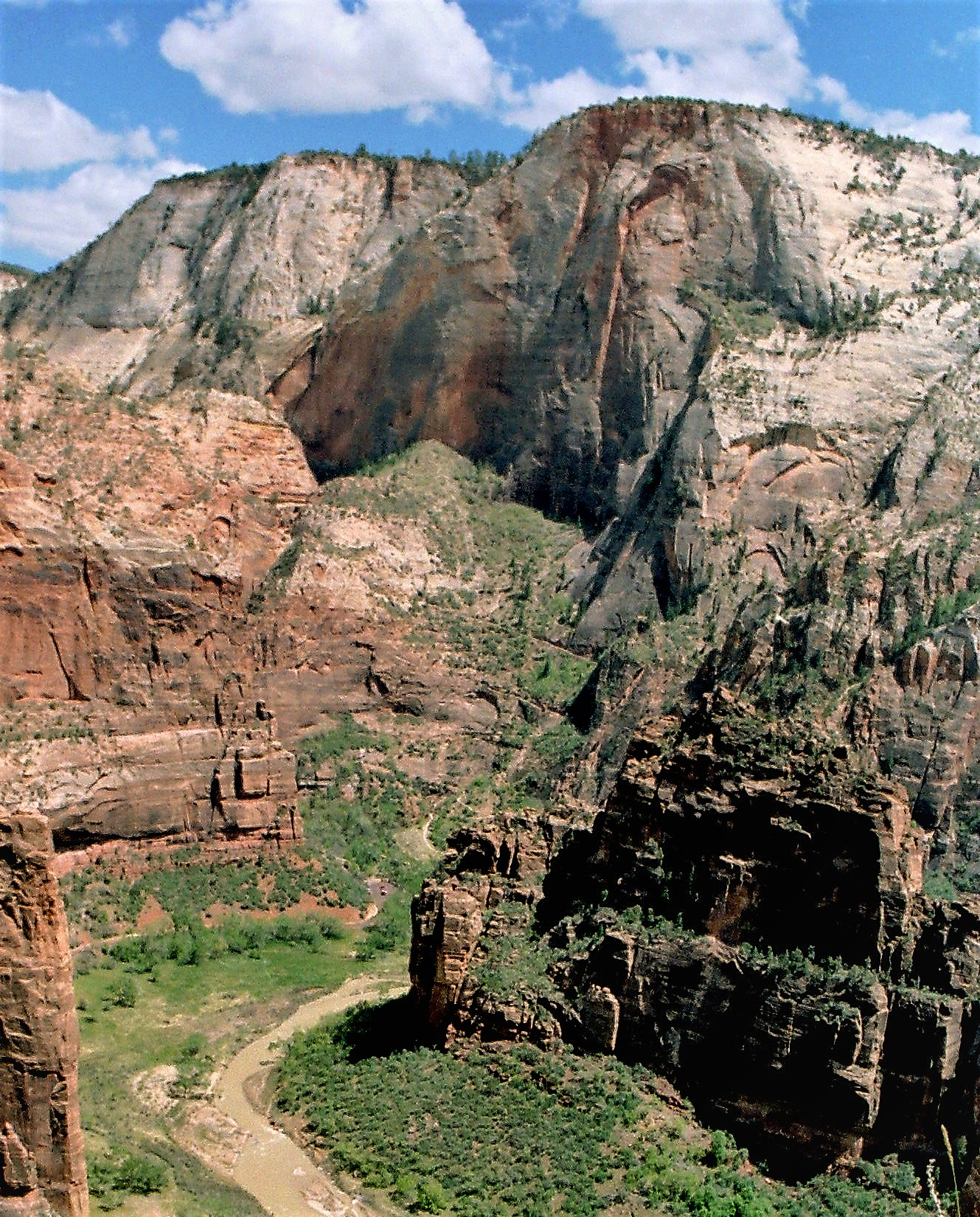
- Northwest aspect, from Angels Landing Trail (The Organ in lower right)

Highest point
- Elevation: 6,940 ft (2,120 m)
- Coordinates: 37°16′02″N 112°56′00″W

Geography
- Location within Utah Location within the United States
- Country: United States
- State: Utah
- County: Washington
- Protected area: Zion National Park
- Parent range: Colorado Plateau
- Topo map: USGS Temple of Sinawava

Geology
- Rock age: Jurassic
- Rock type: Navajo sandstone

Climbing
- Easiest route: class 1 hiking trail

Cable Mountain is a 6,940-foot (2,120 m) elevation Navajo Sandstone summit located in Zion National Park, in Washington County of southwest Utah, United States. Towering 2,600 feet (790 meters) above the floor of Zion Canyon at the Big Bend area, Cable Mountain is situated immediately northeast of The Great White Throne, separated by the chasm of Hidden Canyon. It is set on the east side of the North Fork Virgin River which drains precipitation runoff from this mountain. Its neighbors include Angels Landing, Cathedral Mountain, The Organ, and Observation Point. This mountain's name was officially adopted in 1934 by the U.S. Board on Geographic Names. It is so named in association with the draw-works which used cables to lower timber from the top of the plateau down to the valley bottom from 1901 through 1927. Wood to construct the Zion Lodge came down the cable works. A 7.4-mile trail, much of it an old wagon road, leads to the views from the top.

== Climate ==
Spring and fall are the most favorable seasons to visit Cable Mountain. According to the Köppen climate classification system, it is located in a Cold semi-arid climate zone, which is defined by the coldest month having an average mean temperature below 32 °F (0 °C), and at least 50% of the total annual precipitation being received during the spring and summer. This desert climate receives less than 10 inches (250 millimeters) of annual rainfall, and snowfall is generally light during the winter.

== Gallery ==
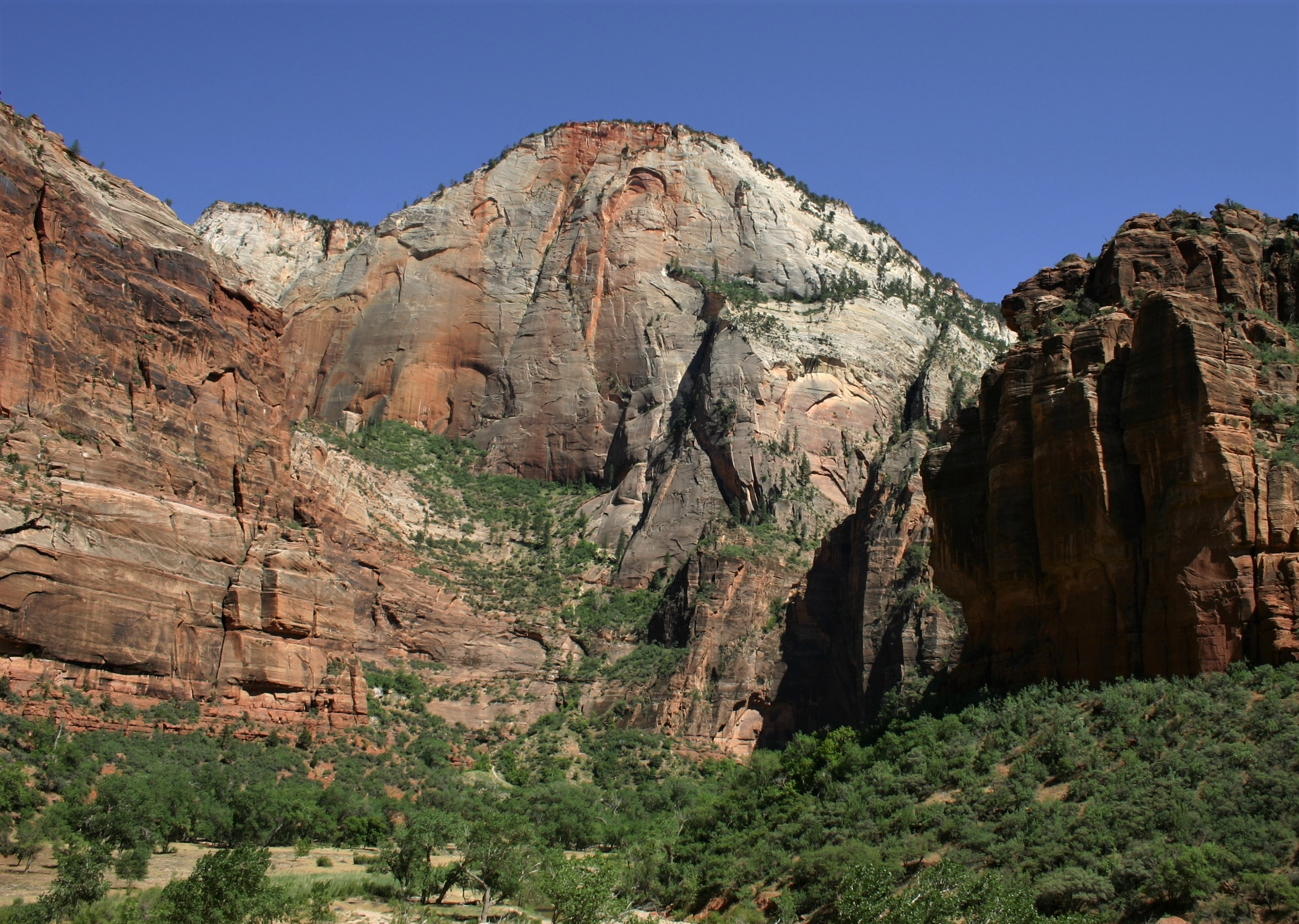

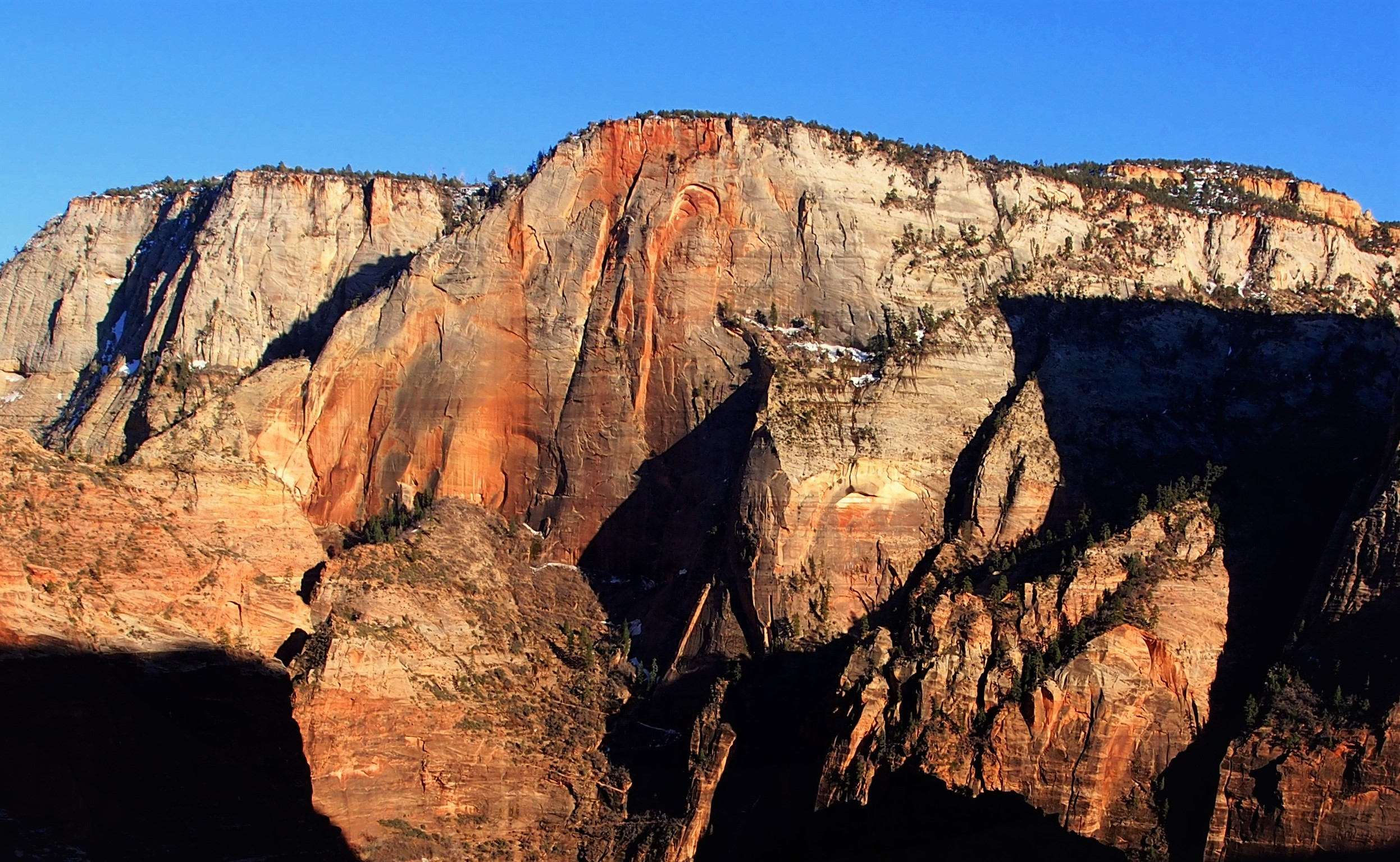

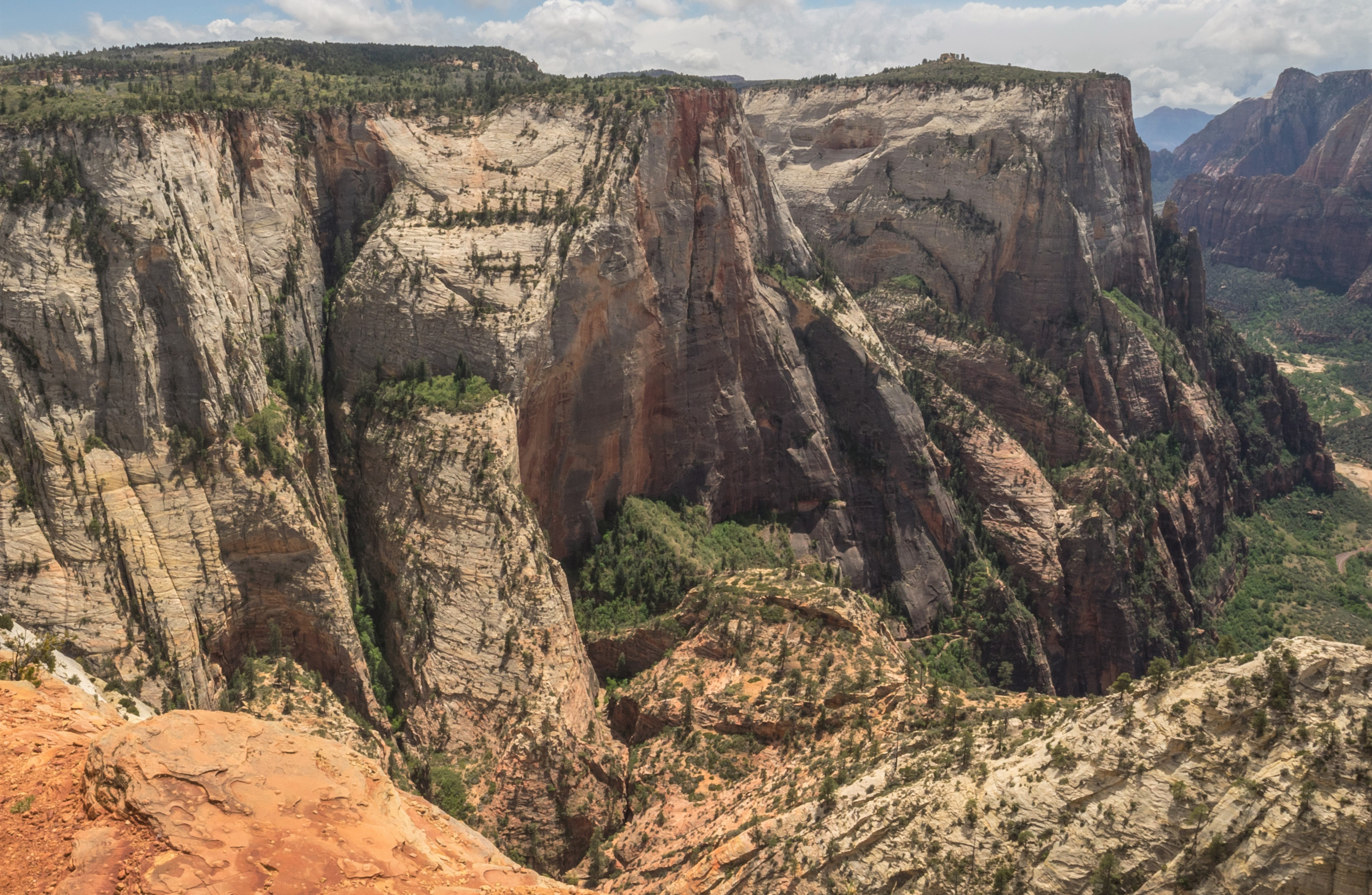
Cable Mountain from northeast

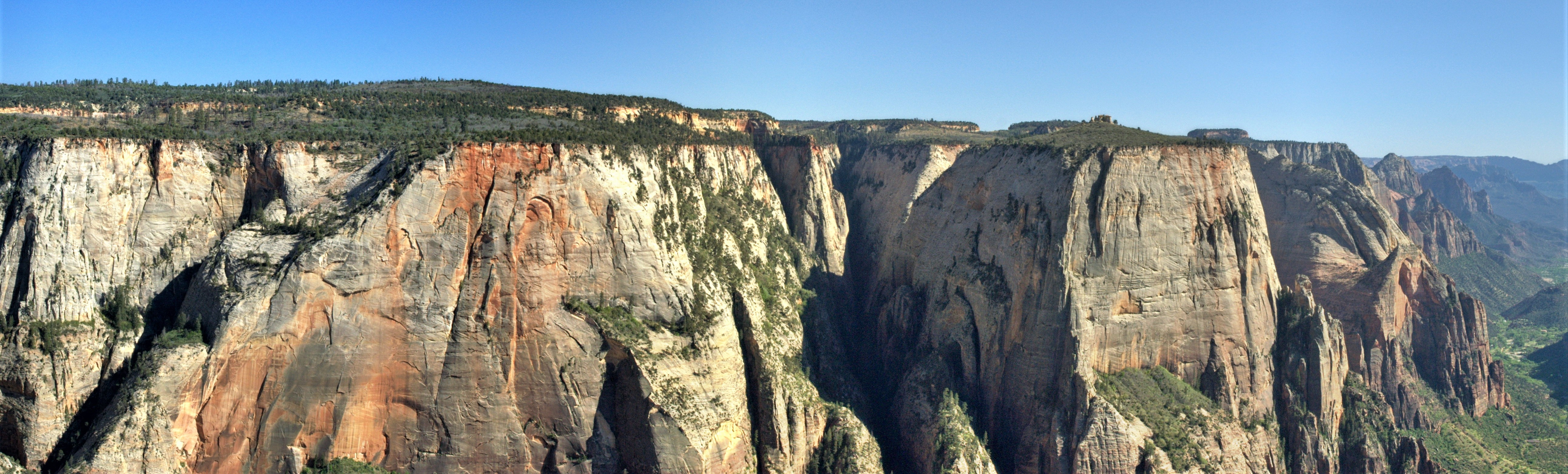
Cable Mountain (red cliff), The Great White Throne (right), from Observation Point

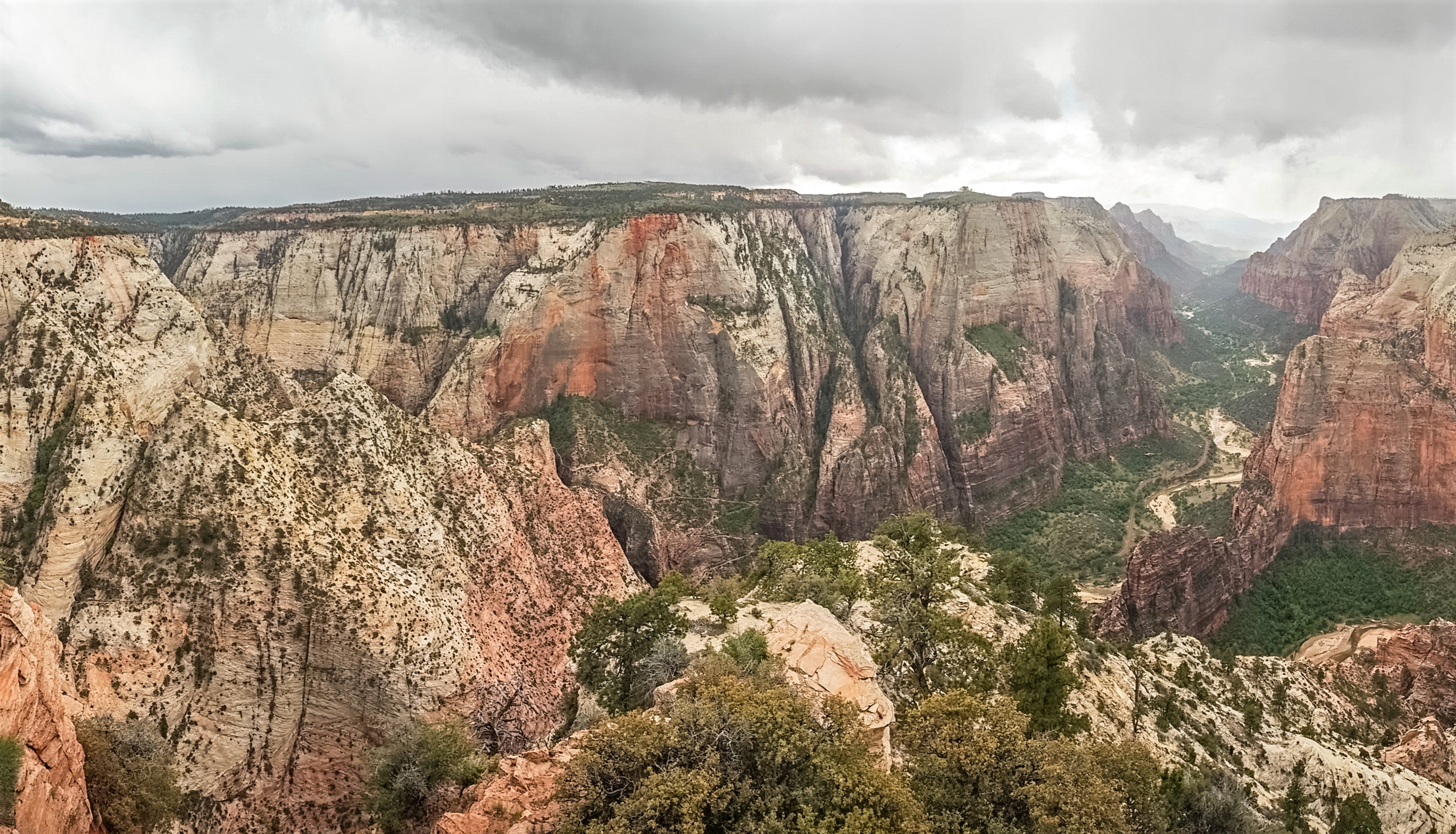
Cable Mountain centered

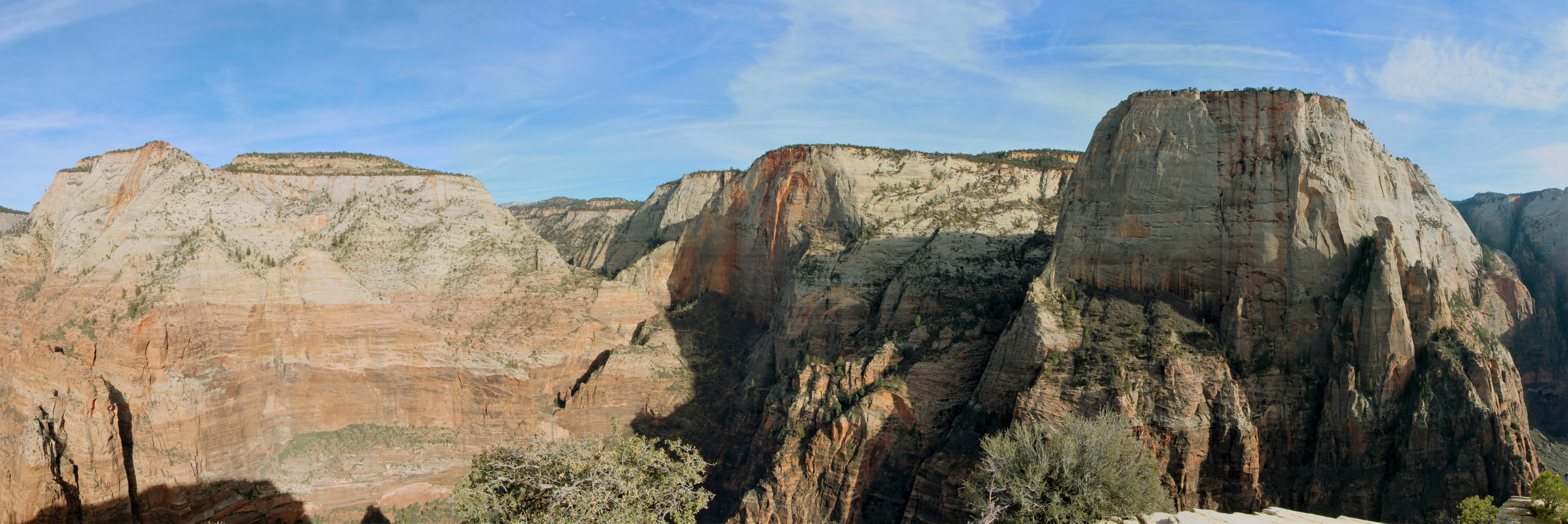
Observation Point left, Cable Mountain centered, The Great White Throne right.
Viewed from Angels Landing

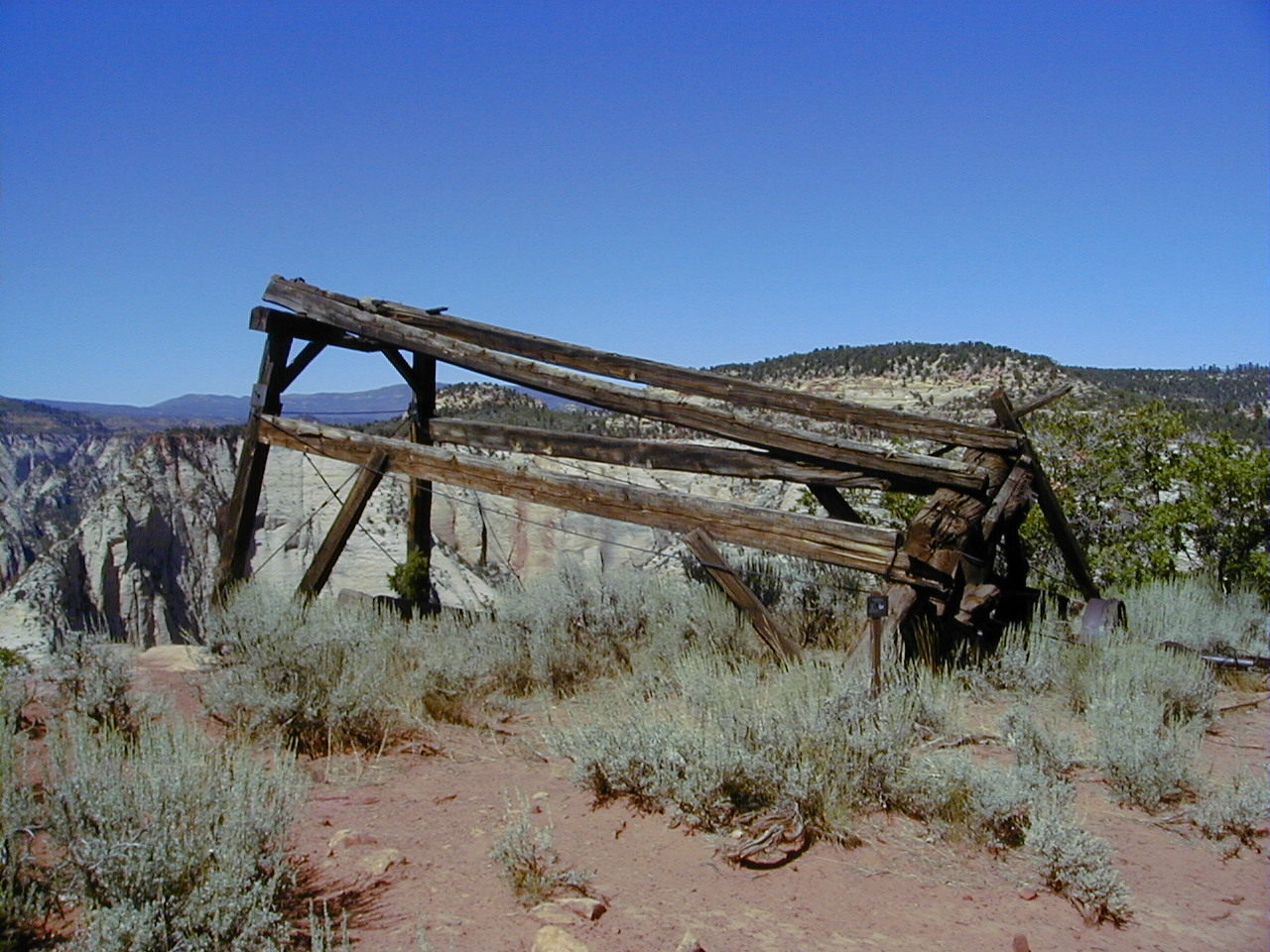
Cable Mountain Draw Works relics

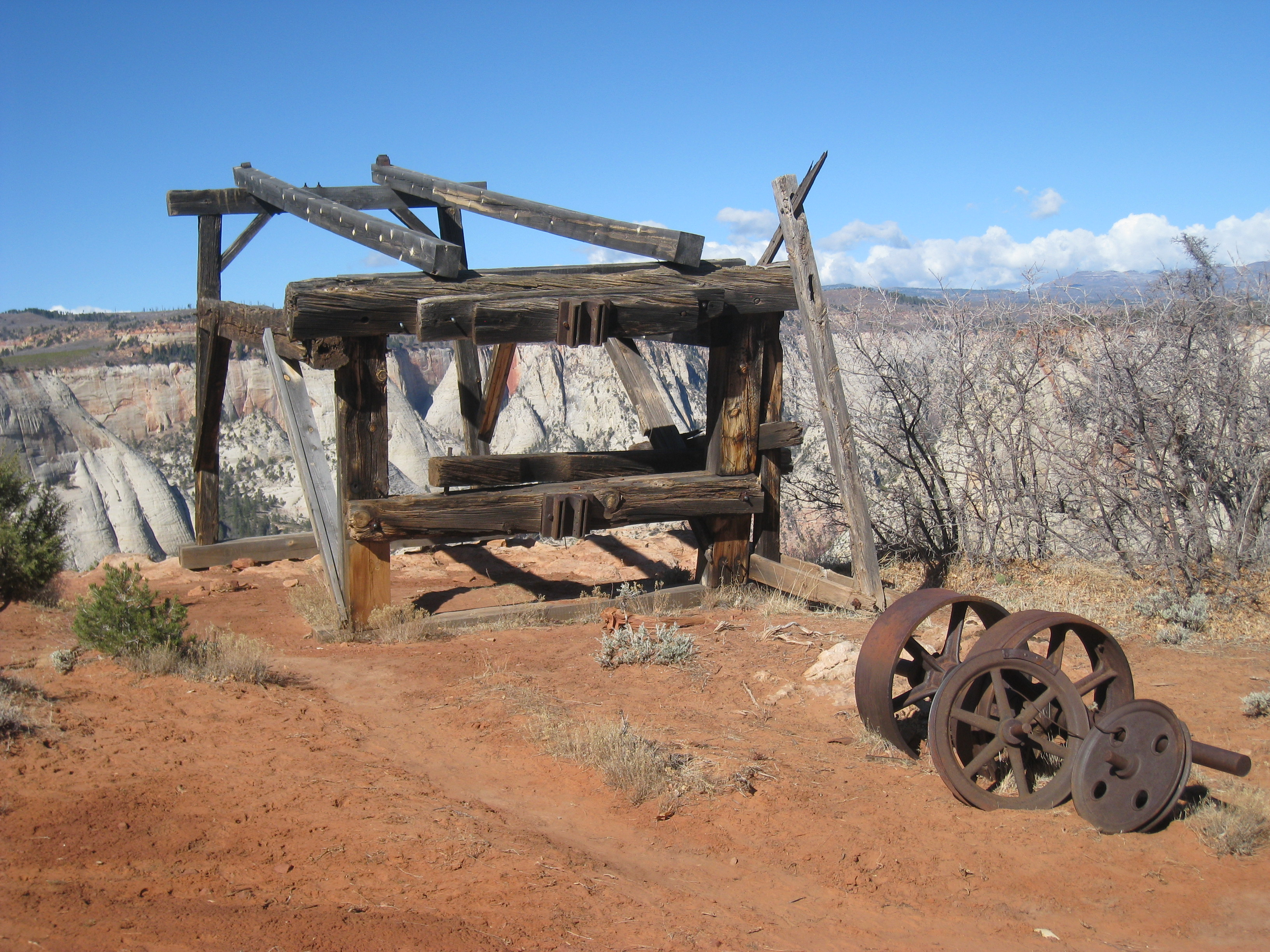
Cable Mountain Draw Works headframe and machinery

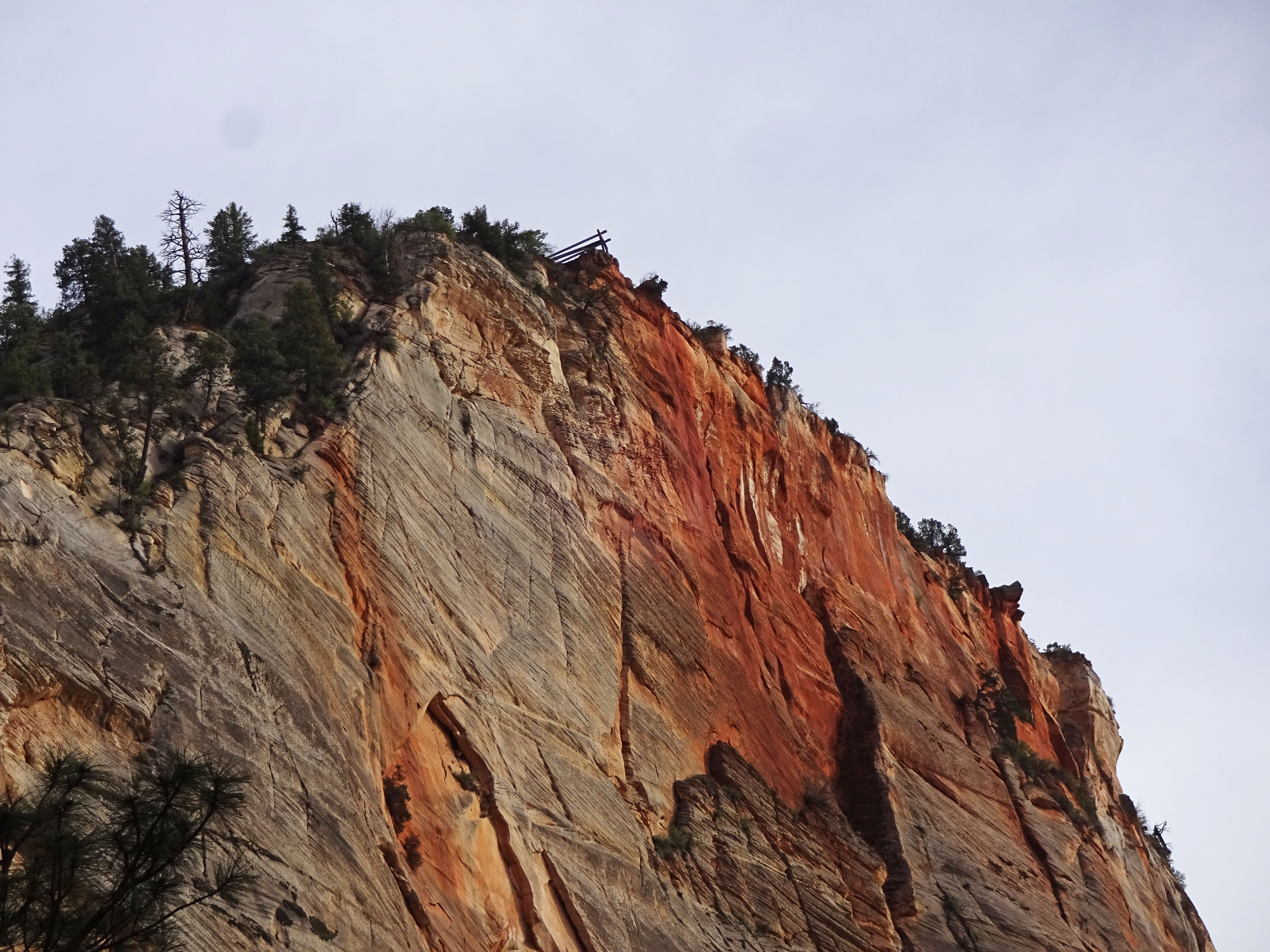
Draw works at the top

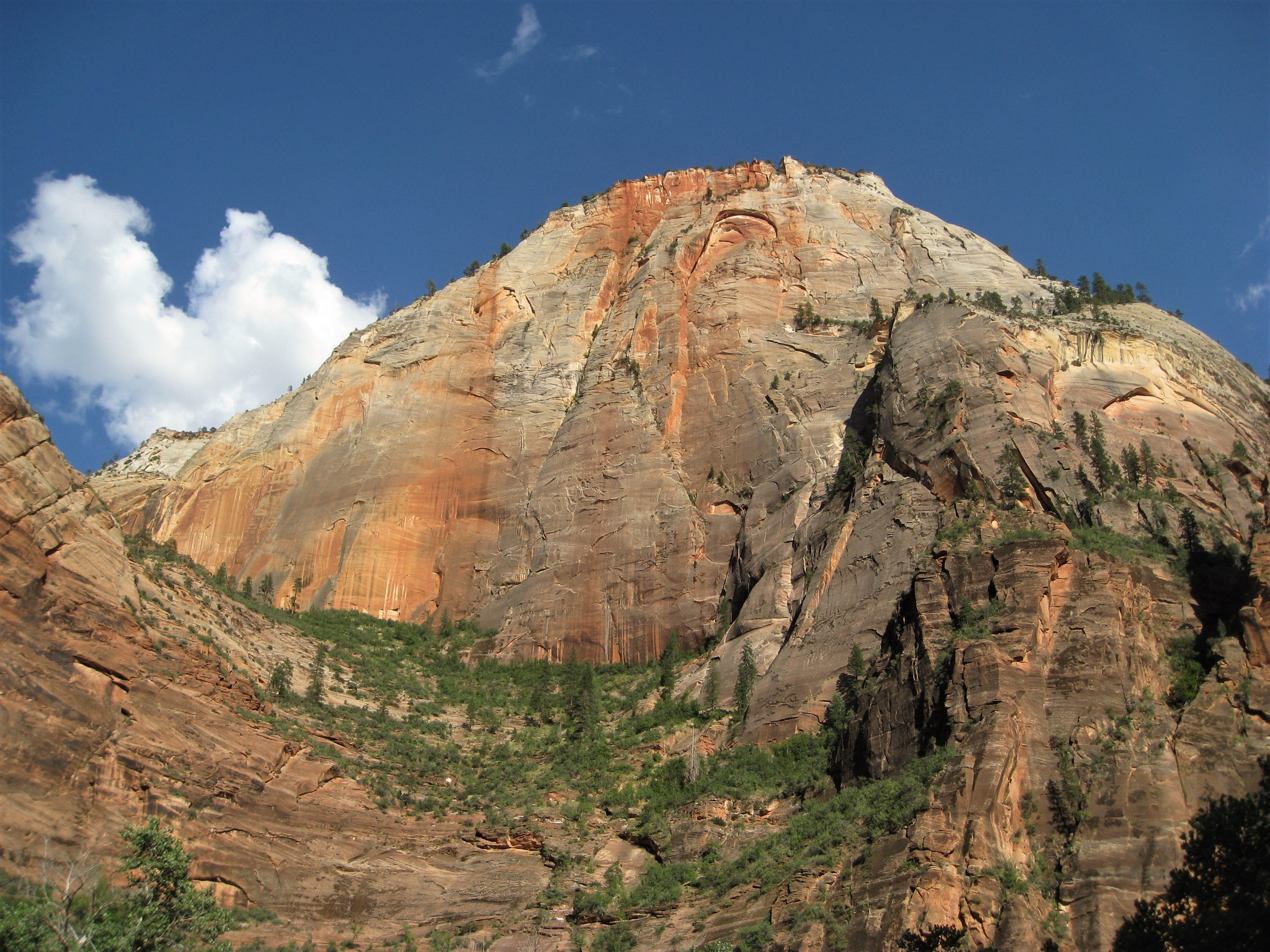

== Cable Mountain Draw Works ==
The Cable Mountain Draw Works was built by David Flanigan beginning in 1901, although he had first proposed the system as a teenager in 1885. From 1904, timber was harvested from the heights above the valley and moved from Cable Mountain down to the draw works in the valley, a vertical distance of 2,000 feet (610 m). The system fulfilled an 1863 prophecy made by Brigham Young that timber would descend from the cliffs "like a hawk flying." Before the draw works were constructed, the timber on Cable Mountain was obtained only by a ten-day round trip. Flanigan sold the operation in 1906 to Alfred Stout and O.D. Gifford of Springdale, who operated it as the Cable Mountain Timber Works. The draw works were destroyed by lightning and rebuilt in 1911. Intermittent operation continued until 1926 when the system was abandoned. The cables were removed in 1930. It is the oldest pre-park structure in Zion. The site was individually listed on the National Register of Historic Places on May 24, 1978, reference number 78000281. The chief remaining structure is a wood headframe on Cable Mountain. The structures at the bottom of the cables consisted of snubbing posts to separate the cables. Nothing remains of the lower end of the draw works.

== See also ==
- Geology of the Zion and Kolob canyons area
- Colorado Plateau
