= Great White Throne (mountain) =

Mountain in Utah, United States

The Great White Throne
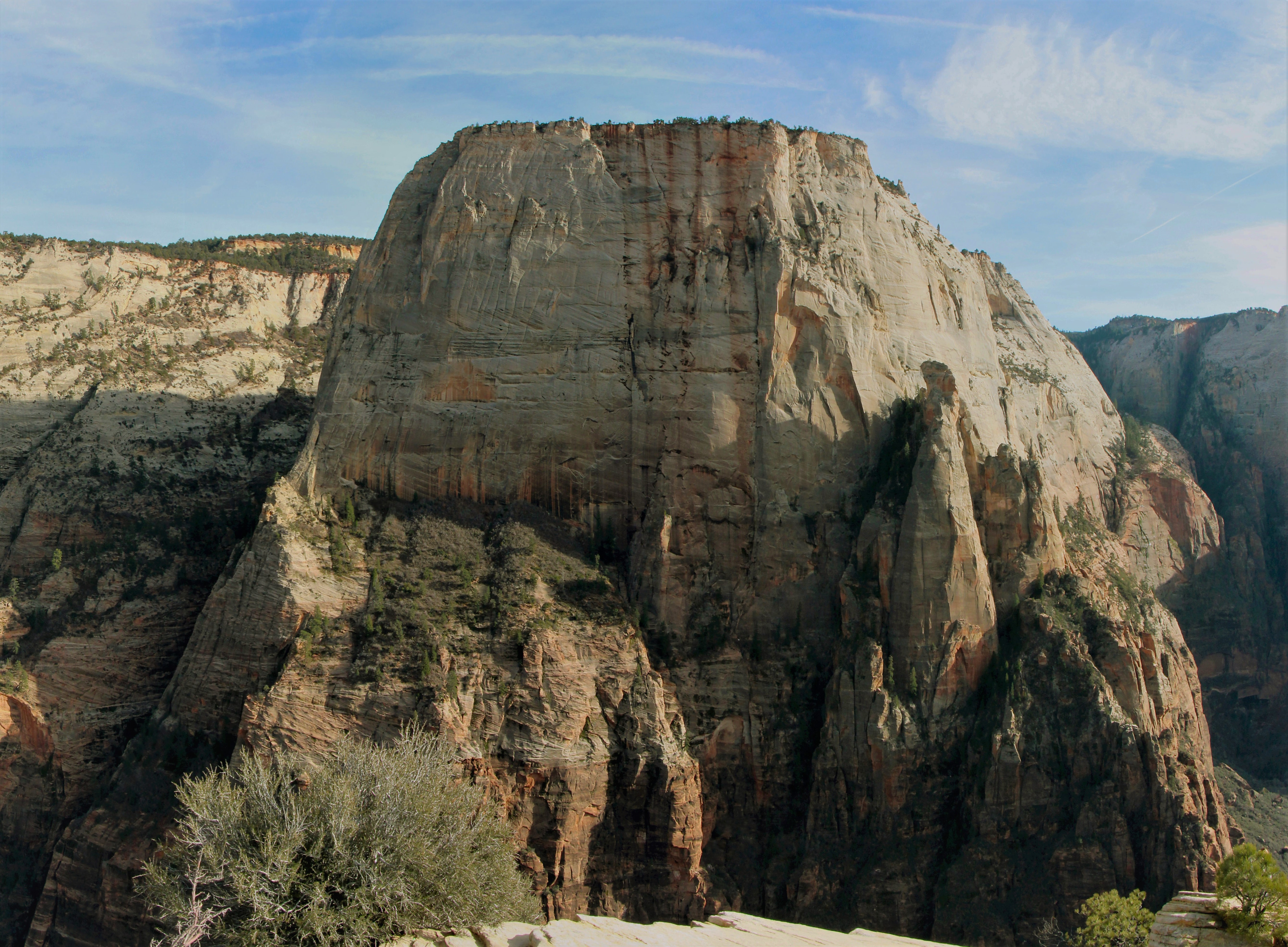
- Northwest aspect, seen from Angels Landing

Highest point
- Elevation: 6,747 ft (2,056 m) NAVD 88
- Prominence: 664 ft (202 m)
- Coordinates: 37°15′40″N 112°56′28″W

Geography
- Location within Utah
- Location: Zion National Park; Washington County, Utah; United States
- Topo map: USGS Temple of Sinawava

The Great White Throne is a monolith, predominantly composed of white Navajo Sandstone in Zion National Park in Washington County in southwestern Utah, United States. The north-west "main" face rises 2,350 feet (720 m) from the floor of Zion Canyon near Angels Landing. It is often used as a symbol of Zion National Park. The Great White Throne can be seen from many locations along the scenic drive running through Zion Canyon.

== Naming ==
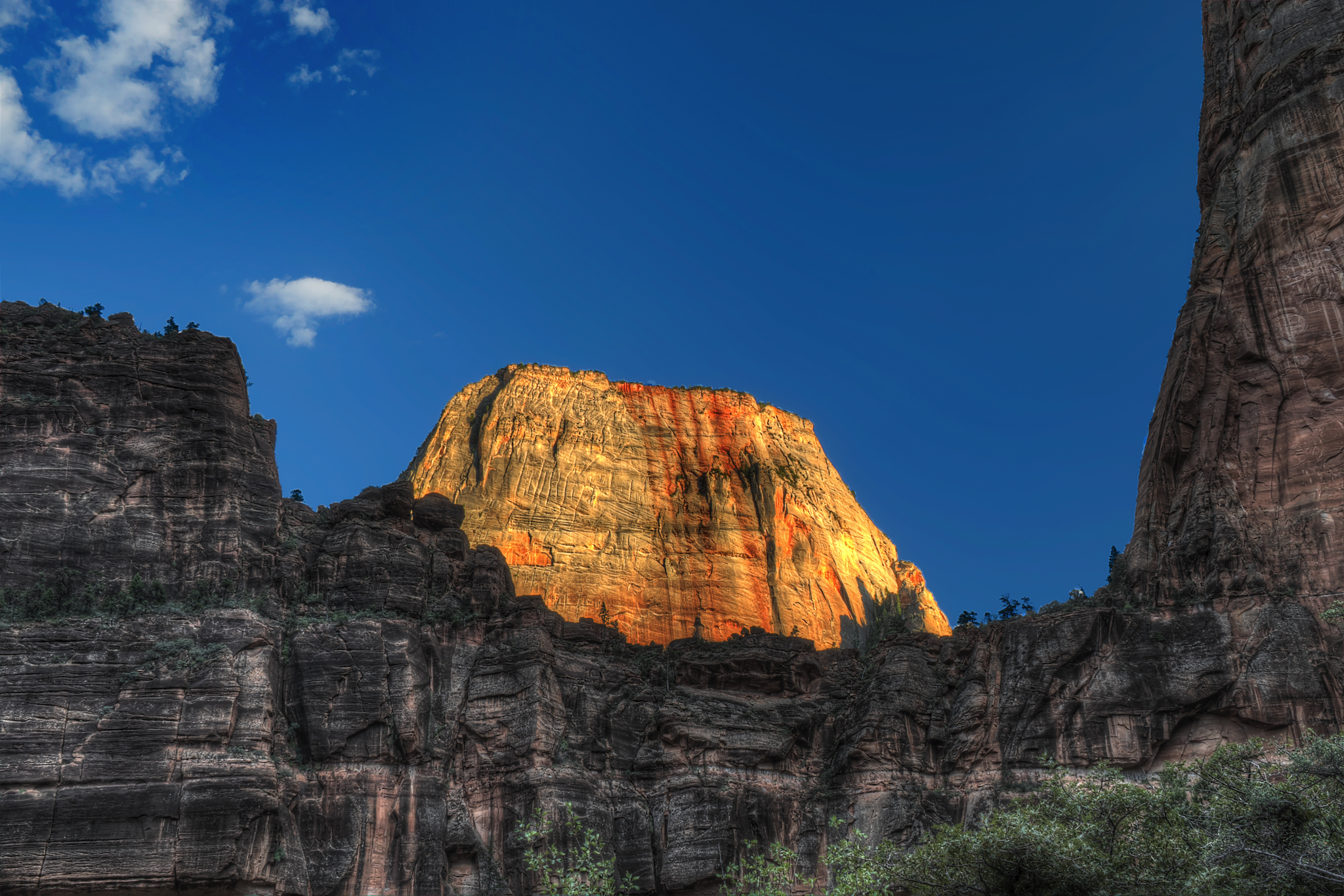
The Great White Throne, August 2016

The Great White Throne was named by the Methodist minister of Ogden, Utah, Frederick Vining Fisher, in 1916. On a trip up the canyon with Claud Hirschi, Fisher and Hirschi named many features in Zion Canyon. Later afternoon light gloriously lit up The Great White Throne, prompting Fischer to state:

Never have I seen such a sight before. It is by all odds America's masterpiece. Boys, I have looked for this mountain all my life but I never expected to find it in this world. This mountain is the Great White Throne.

== Climbing regulations ==
A bivouac permit is required from the park visitor center for any climbs expected to last overnight.

== Climate ==
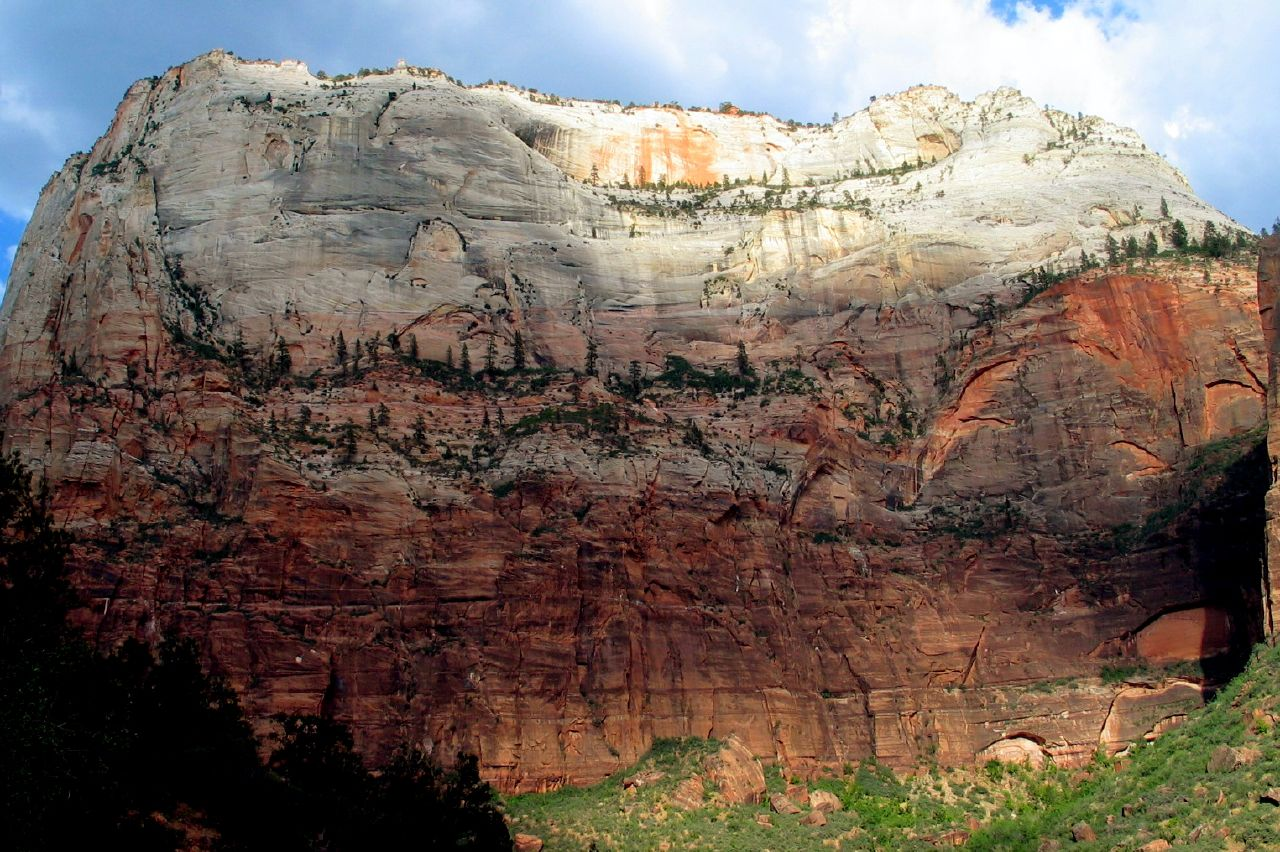
West Face

Spring and fall are the most favorable seasons to visit The Great White Throne. According to the Köppen climate classification system, it is located in a Cold semi-arid climate zone, which is defined by the coldest month having an average mean temperature below 32 °F (0 °C), and at least 50% of the total annual precipitation being received during the spring and summer. This desert climate receives less than 10 inches (250 millimeters) of annual rainfall, and snowfall is generally light during the winter.

== See also ==
- Geology of the Zion and Kolob canyons area
- Colorado Plateau
- List of mountains in Utah
