= Castle Dome (Zion National Park) =

Mountain in Utah, United States

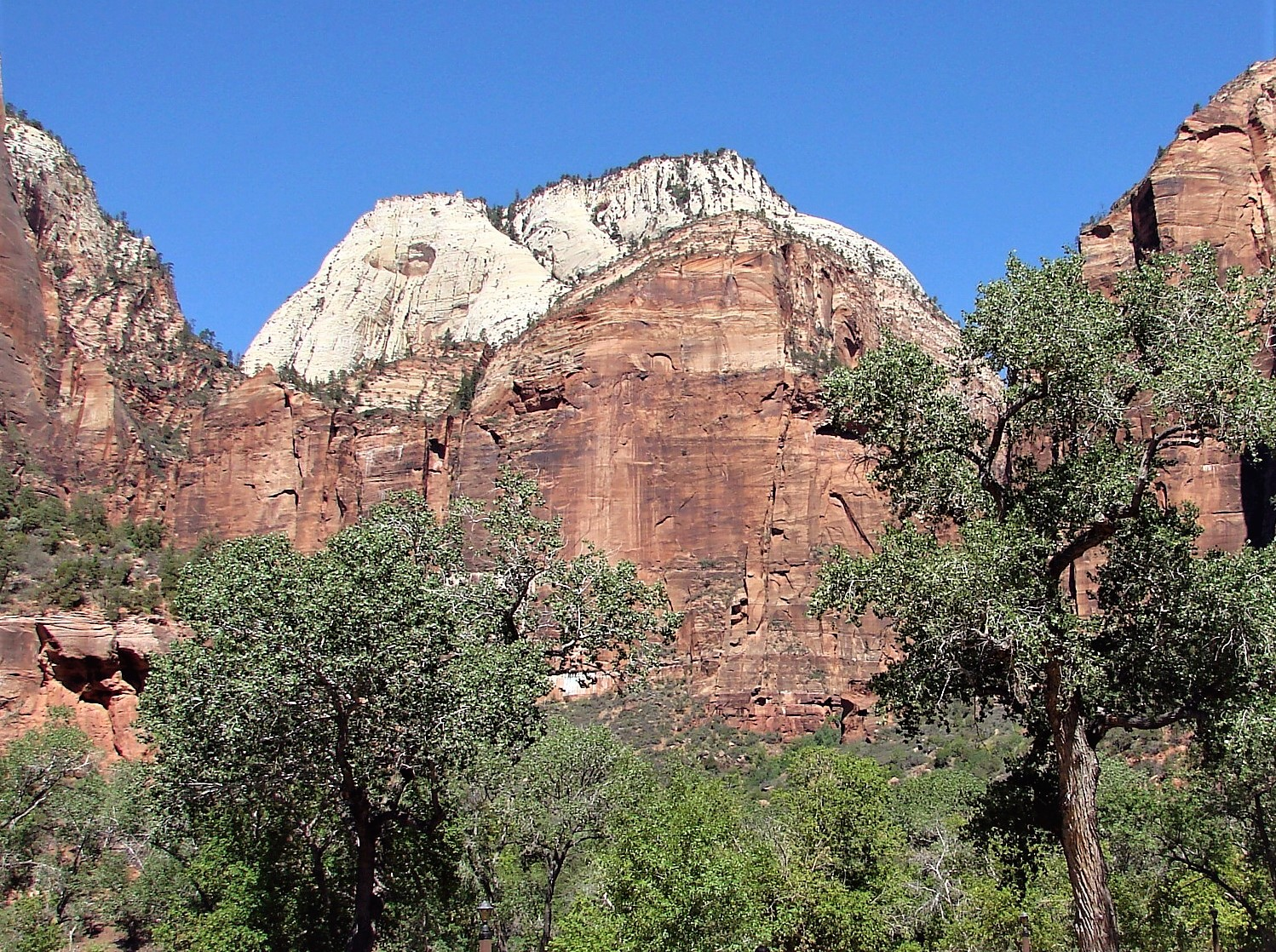
- Southeast aspect, from Zion Lodge

Highest point
- Elevation: 7,054 ft (2,150 m)
- Prominence: 540 ft (160 m)
- Parent peak: Point 7180
- Isolation: 1.00 mi (1.61 km)
- Coordinates: 37°15′58″N 112°58′15″W

Geography
- Location within Utah Location within the United States
- Country: United States
- State: Utah
- County: Washington
- Protected area: Zion National Park
- Parent range: Colorado Plateau
- Topo map: USGS Temple of Sinawava

Geology
- Rock age: Jurassic
- Rock type: Navajo sandstone

Climbing
- First ascent: 2015, Stih and Purcell
- Easiest route: class 5.2 climbing

Castle Dome is a 7,054-foot (2,150 m) elevation Navajo Sandstone summit located in Zion National Park, in Washington County of southwest Utah, United States. Castle Dome is situated northwest of Zion Lodge, towering 2,800 feet (850 m) above the lodge and the floor of Zion Canyon. It is set on the west side of the North Fork Virgin River which drains precipitation runoff from this mountain. It is wedged between Behunin Canyon and Heaps Canyon, with the popular Emerald Pools set at the southeast foot of this mountain. Its neighbors include Mount Majestic, Cathedral Mountain, The Great White Throne, Red Arch Mountain, Mountain of the Sun, and Lady Mountain. This feature's name was officially adopted in 1934 by the U.S. Board on Geographic Names.

== Climate ==
Spring and fall are the most favorable seasons to visit Castle Dome. According to the Köppen climate classification system, it is located in a Cold semi-arid climate zone, which is defined by the coldest month having an average mean temperature below 32 °F (0 °C), and at least 50% of the total annual precipitation being received during the spring and summer. This desert climate receives less than 10 inches (250 millimeters) of annual rainfall, and snowfall is generally light during the winter.

== Gallery ==
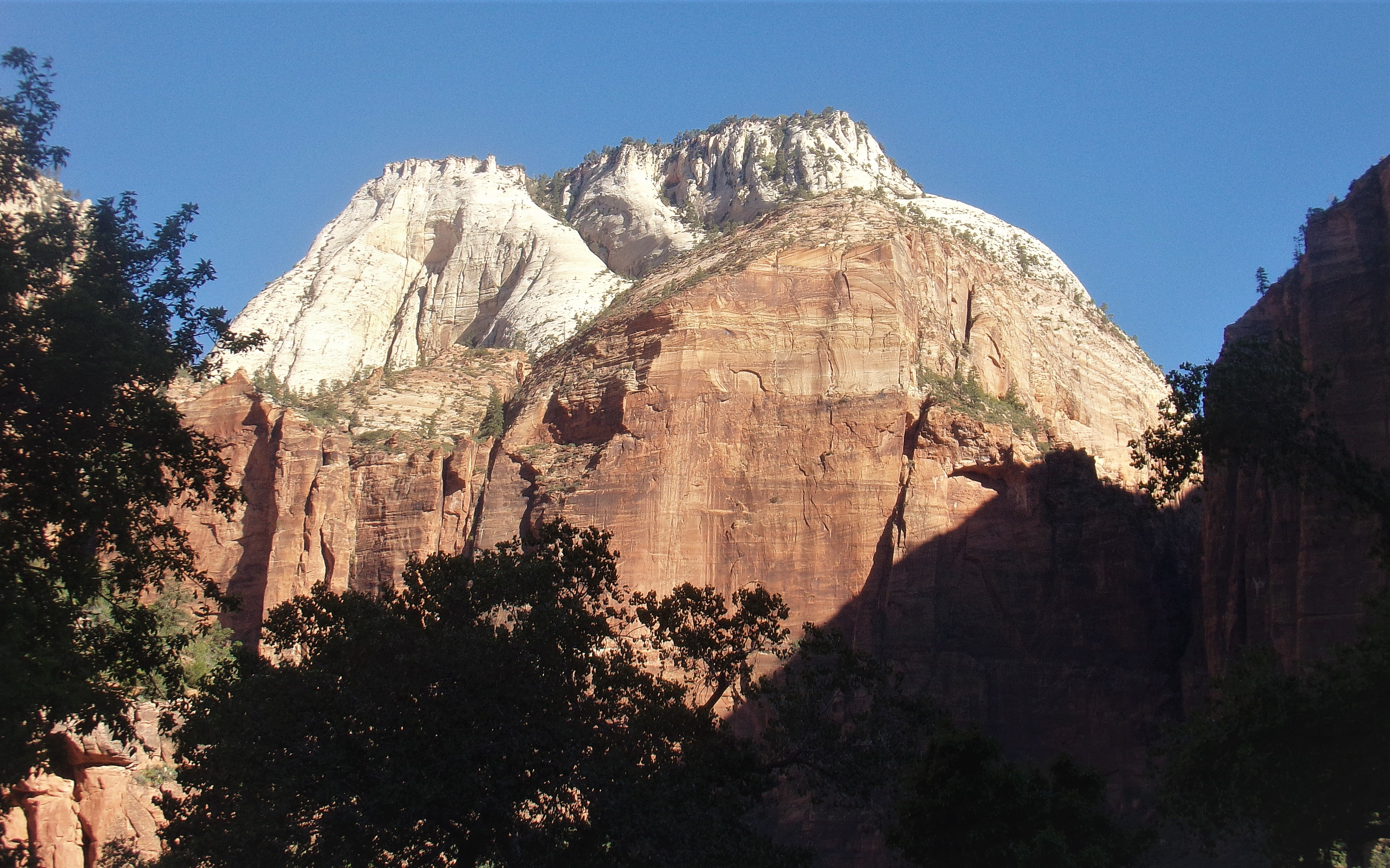

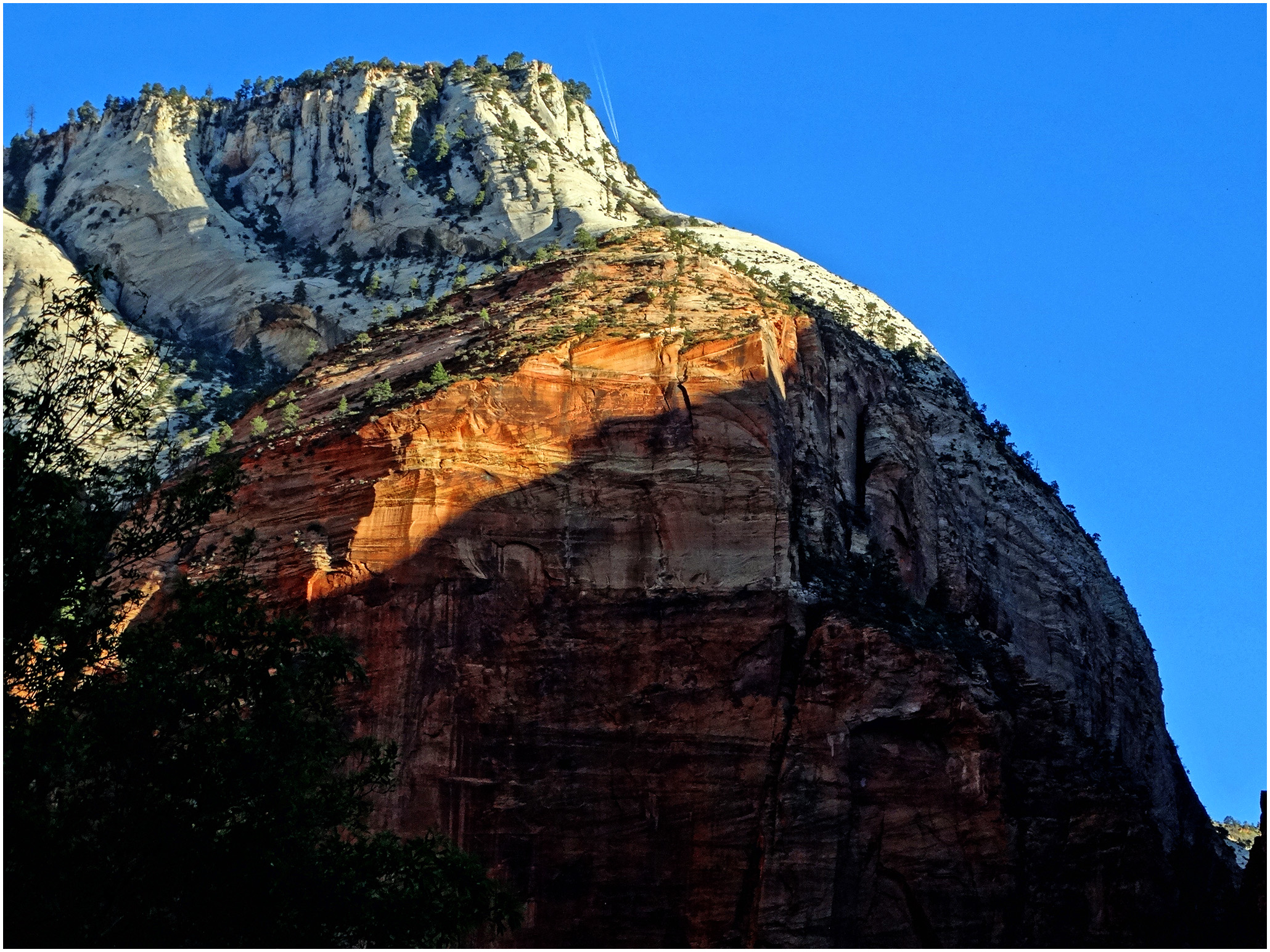

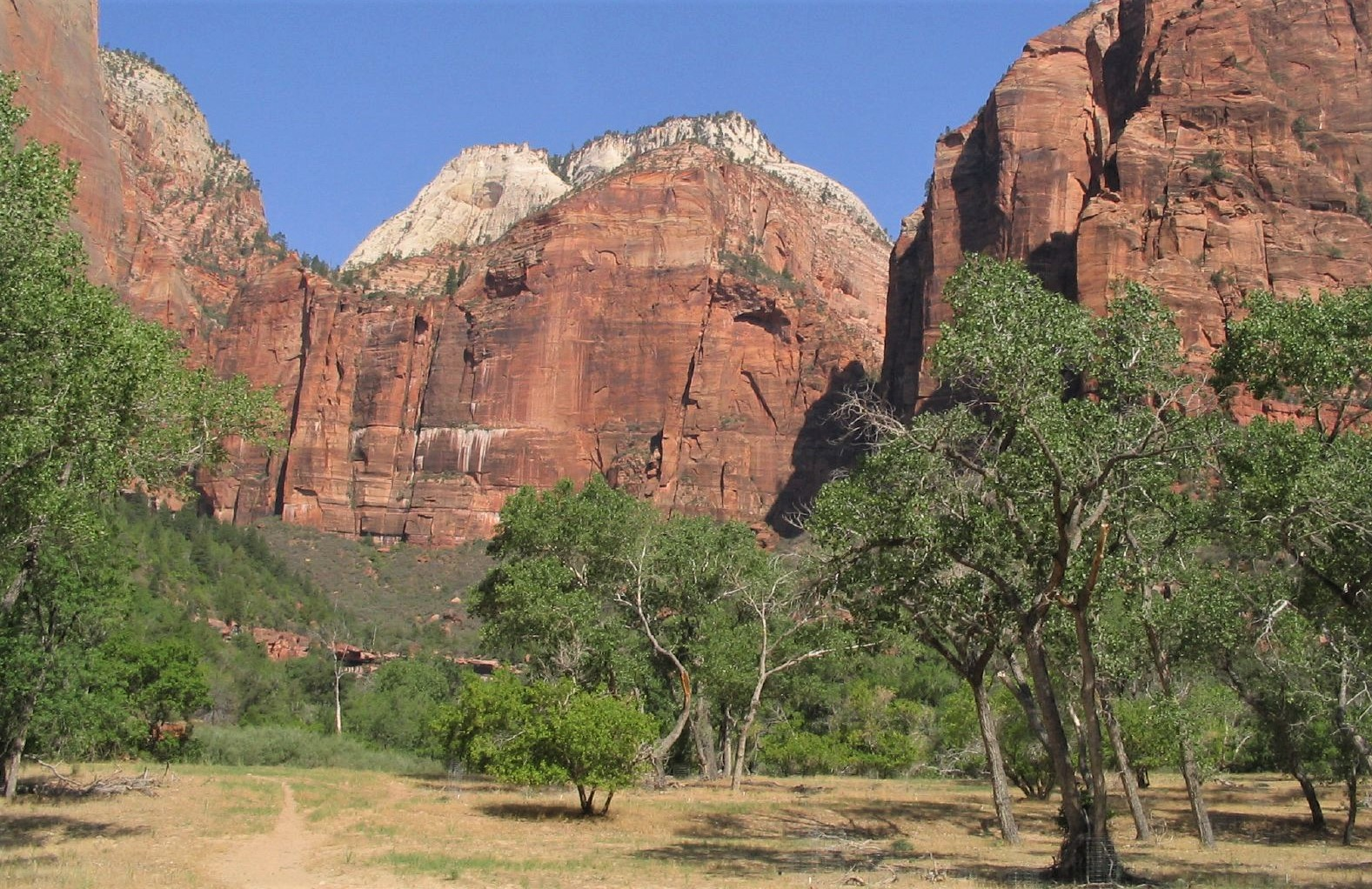
Castle Dome from Zion Lodge

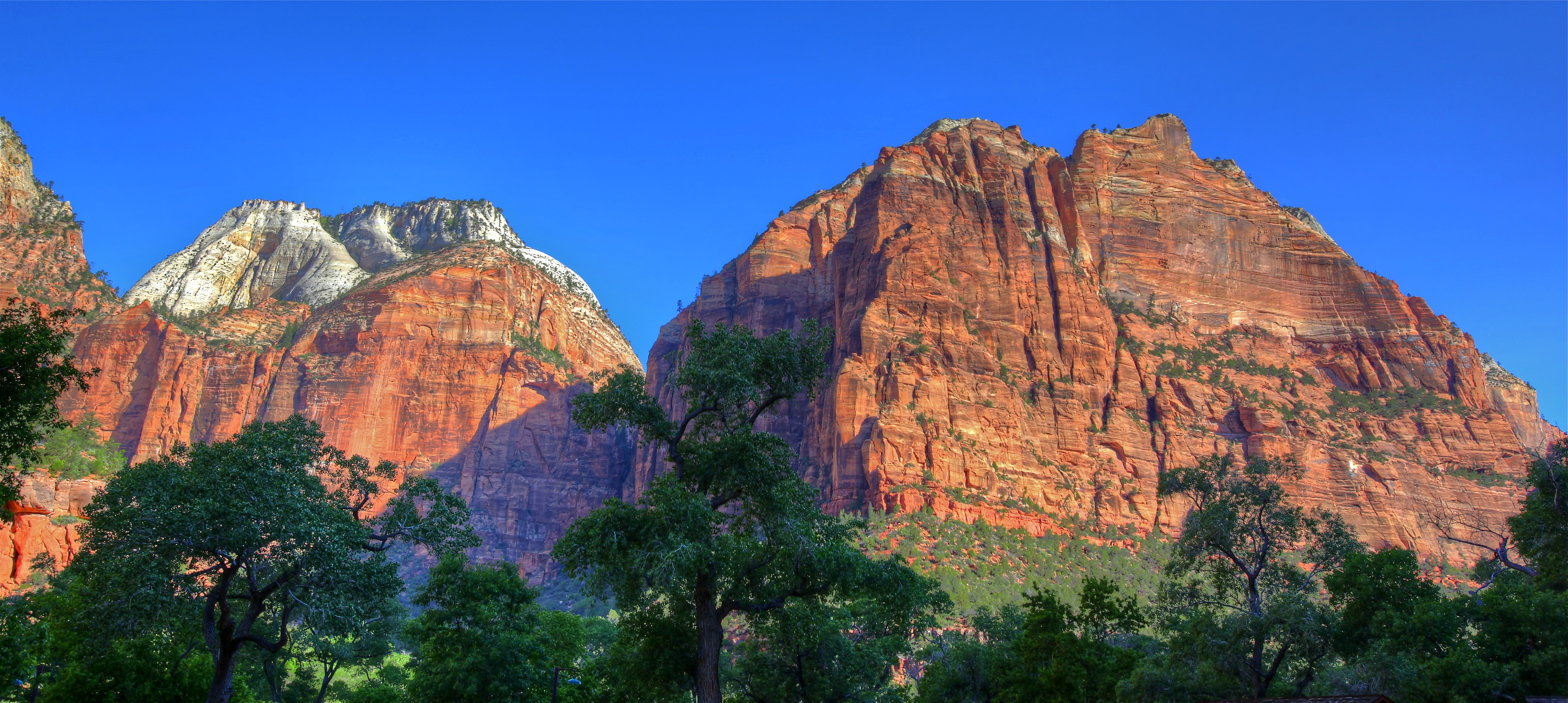
Castle Dome (left), The Spearhead (right)

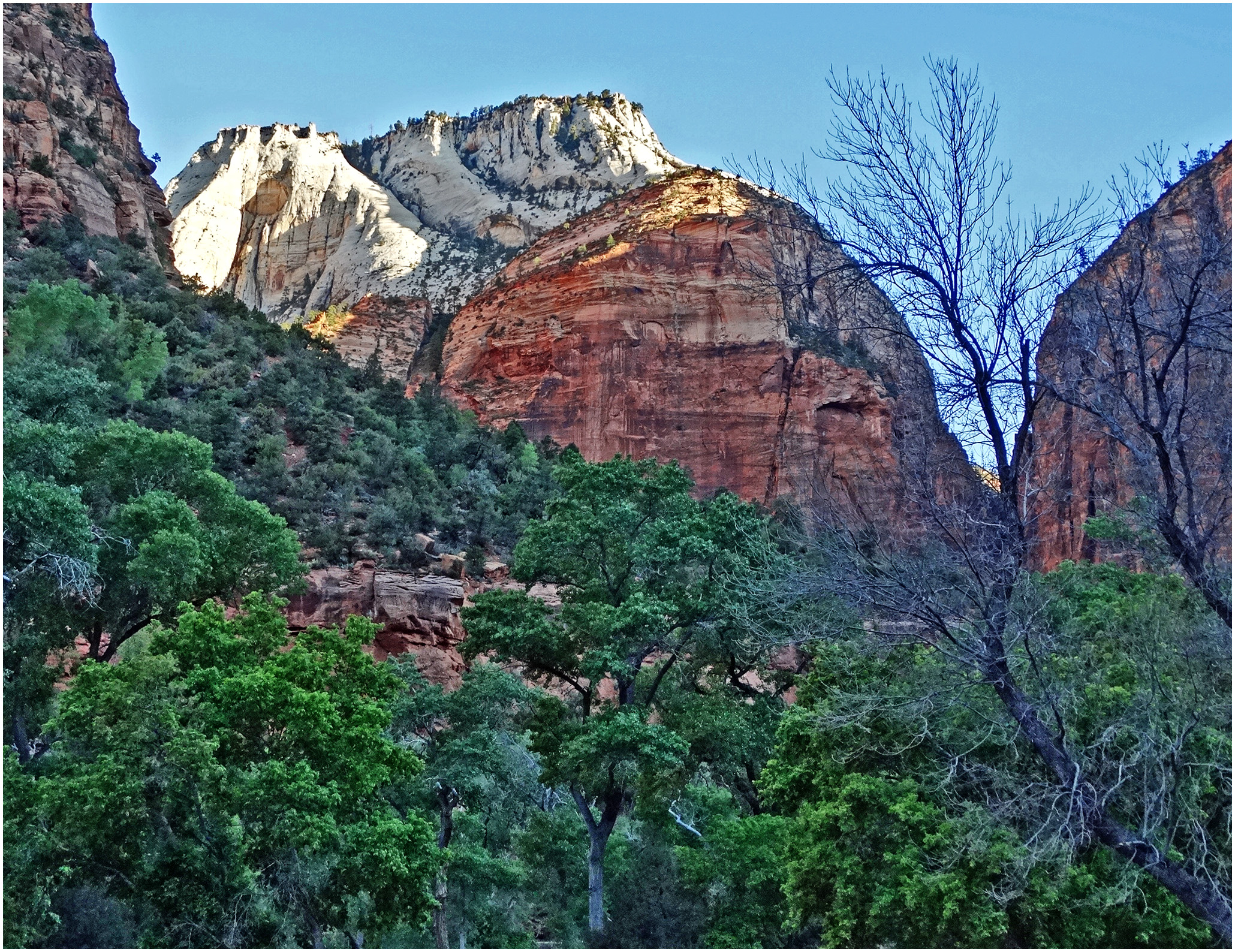
Castle Dome from Zion Lodge

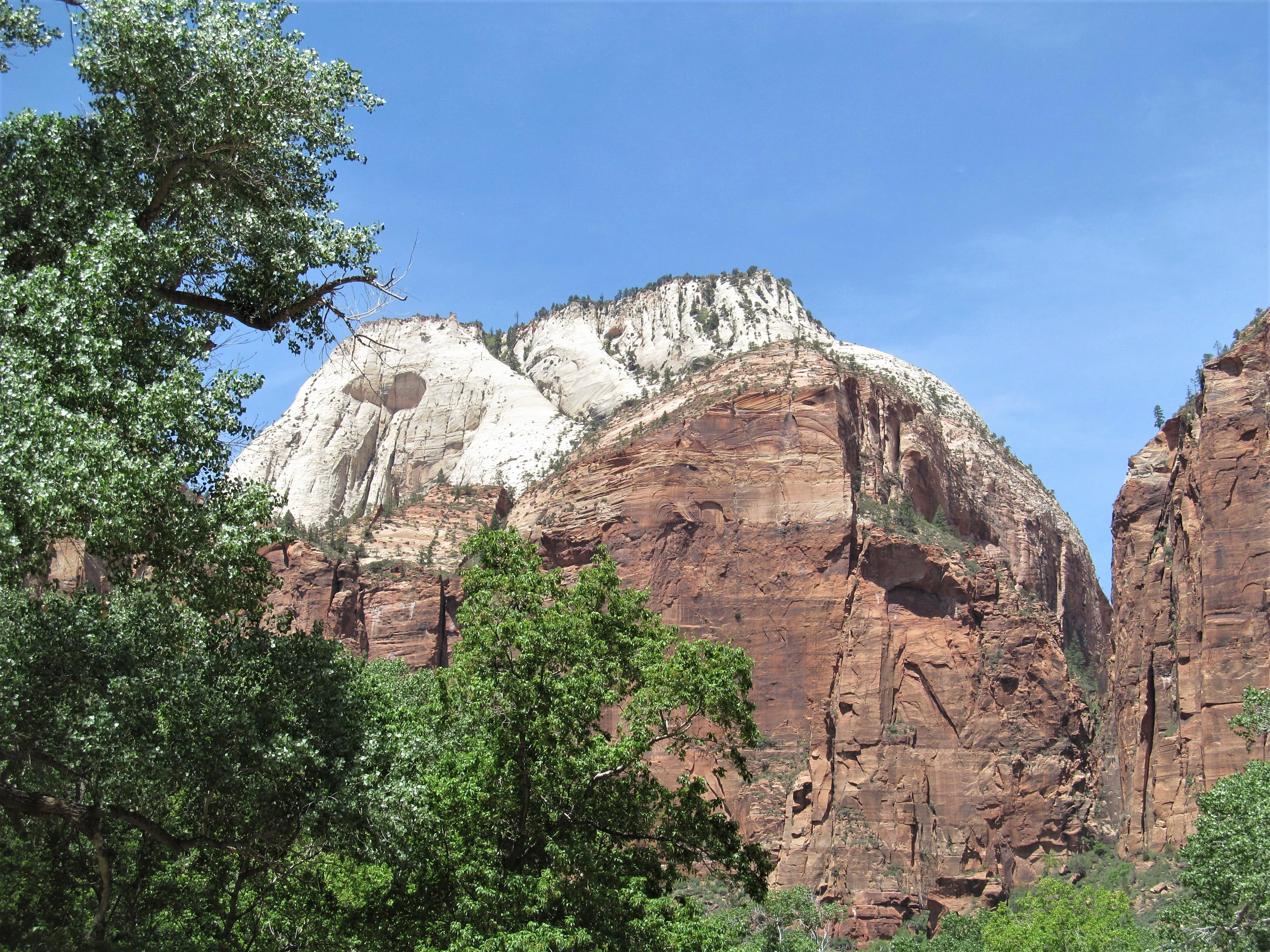

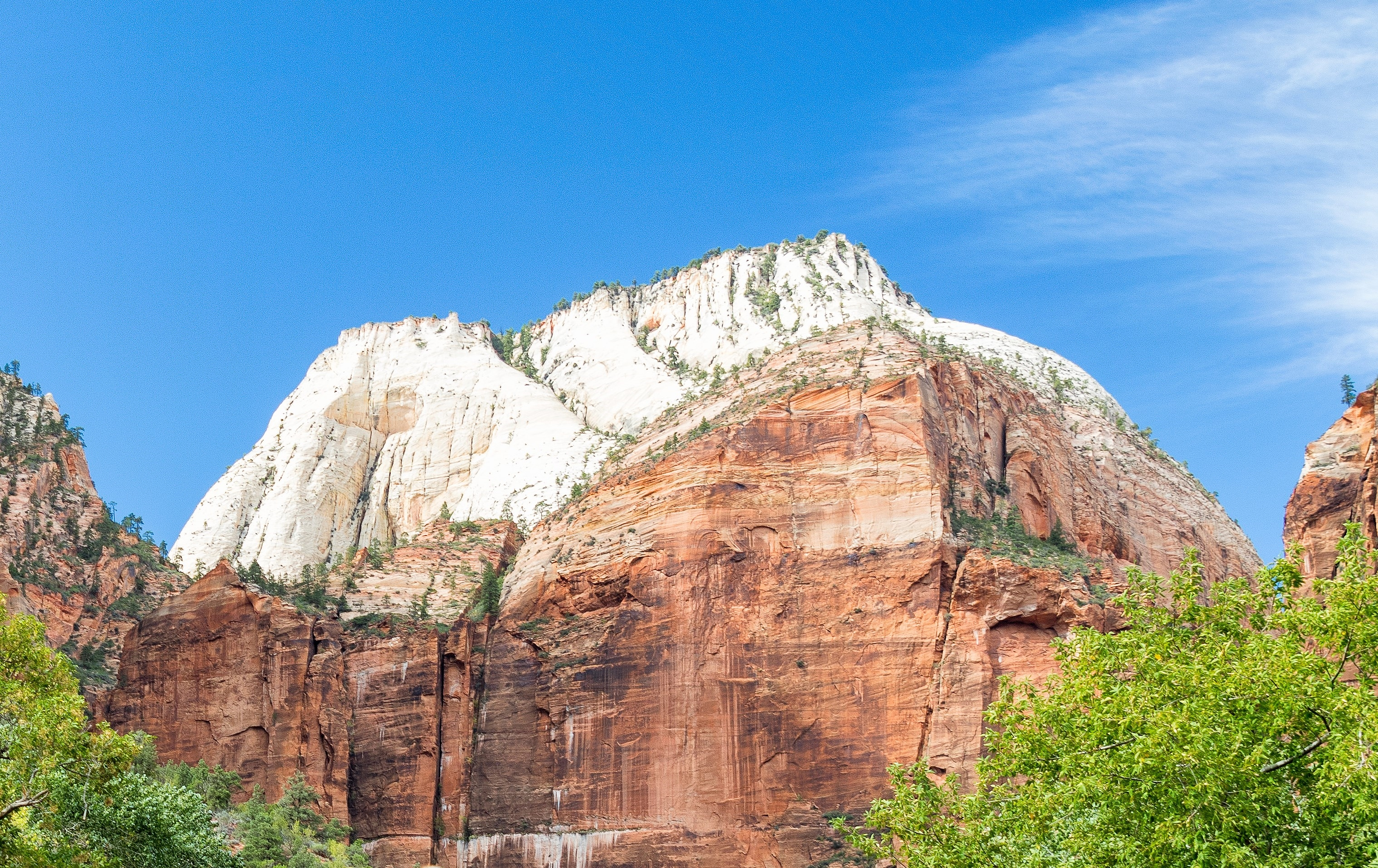

== See also ==
- List of mountains in Utah
- Geology of the Zion and Kolob canyons area
- Colorado Plateau
