= Lady Mountain =

Mountain in the state of Utah

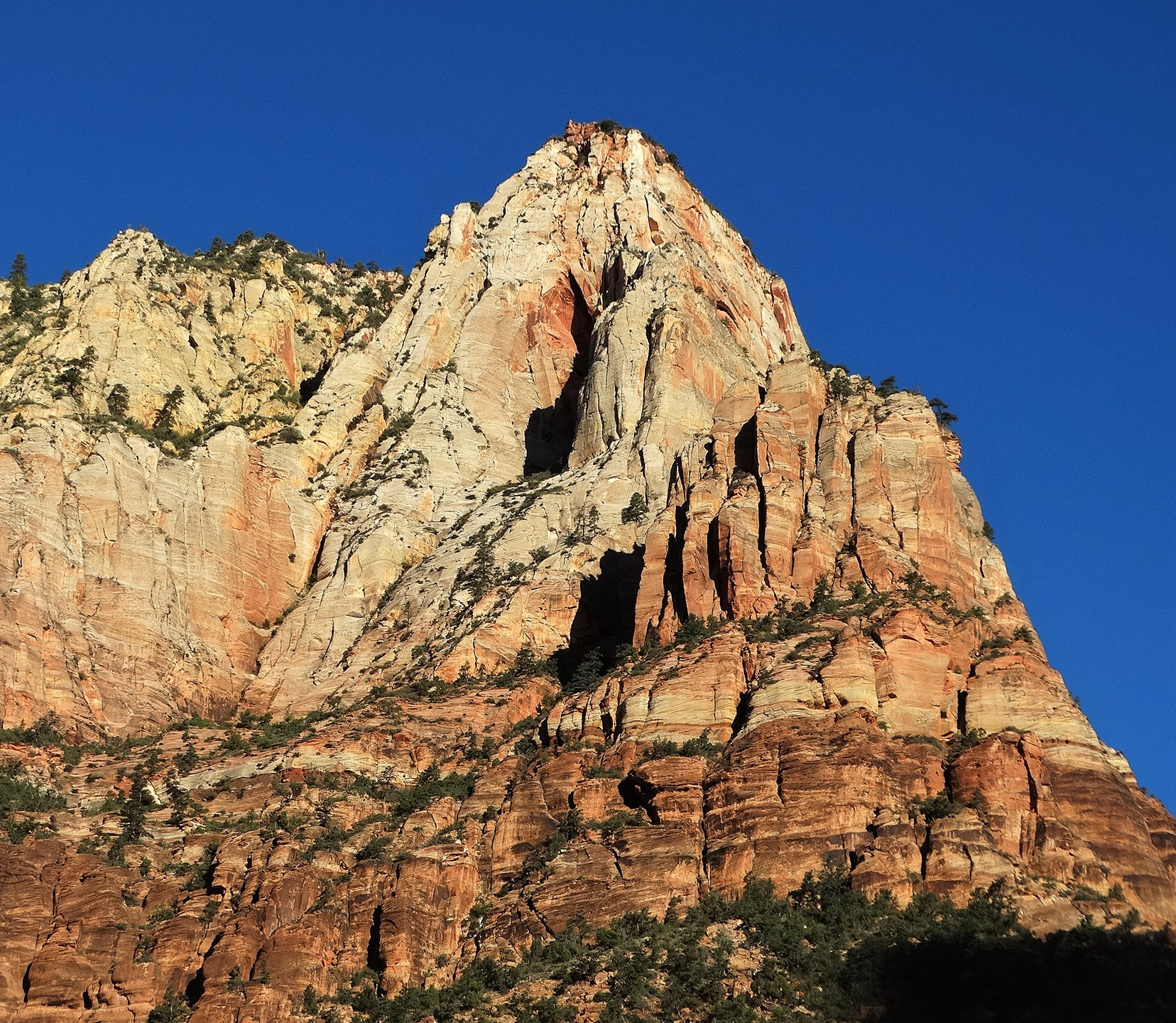
- East aspect, from Zion Lodge, April 2014

Highest point
- Elevation: 6,945 ft (2,117 m)
- Prominence: 305 ft (93 m)
- Parent peak: Point 7180
- Isolation: 0.84 mi (1.35 km)
- Coordinates: 37°15′15″N 112°57′59″W

Geography
- Location within Utah Location within the United States
- Country: United States
- State: Utah
- County: Washington
- Protected area: Zion National Park
- Parent range: Colorado Plateau
- Topo map: USGS Temple of Sinawava

Geology
- Rock age: Jurassic
- Rock type: Navajo sandstone

Climbing
- Easiest route: class 5.4 climbing

Lady Mountain (previously known as Cliff Dwelling Mountain) is a 6,945-foot (2,117 m) elevation Navajo Sandstone summit located in Zion National Park, in Washington County of southwest Utah, United States.

== Description ==
Lady Mountain is situated immediately west of Zion Lodge, towering over 2,700 feet (820 meters) above the lodge and the floor of Zion Canyon. It is set on the west side of the North Fork Virgin River which drains precipitation runoff from this mountain. Its neighbors include Mount Majestic, Cathedral Mountain, The Great White Throne, Red Arch Mountain, Mountain of the Sun, Mount Moroni, Castle Dome, and The Sentinel. This feature was called "Cliff Dwelling Mountain" and "Mount Zion" before the Lady Mountain name was officially adopted in 1934 by the U.S. Board on Geographic Names. It is so named for markings of which early visitors saw a resemblance to a lady's face. In 1925 the park service constructed a climbing "trail" with cables and ladders to the summit, one of the first in the park, but it was later deconstructed due to numerous rescues and fatalities.

== Climate ==
Spring and fall are the most favorable seasons to visit Lady Mountain. According to the Köppen climate classification system, it is located in a Cold semi-arid climate zone, which is defined by the coldest month having an average mean temperature below 32 °F (0 °C), and at least 50% of the total annual precipitation being received during the spring and summer. This desert climate receives less than 10 inches (250 millimeters) of annual rainfall, and snowfall is generally light during the winter.

== Gallery ==
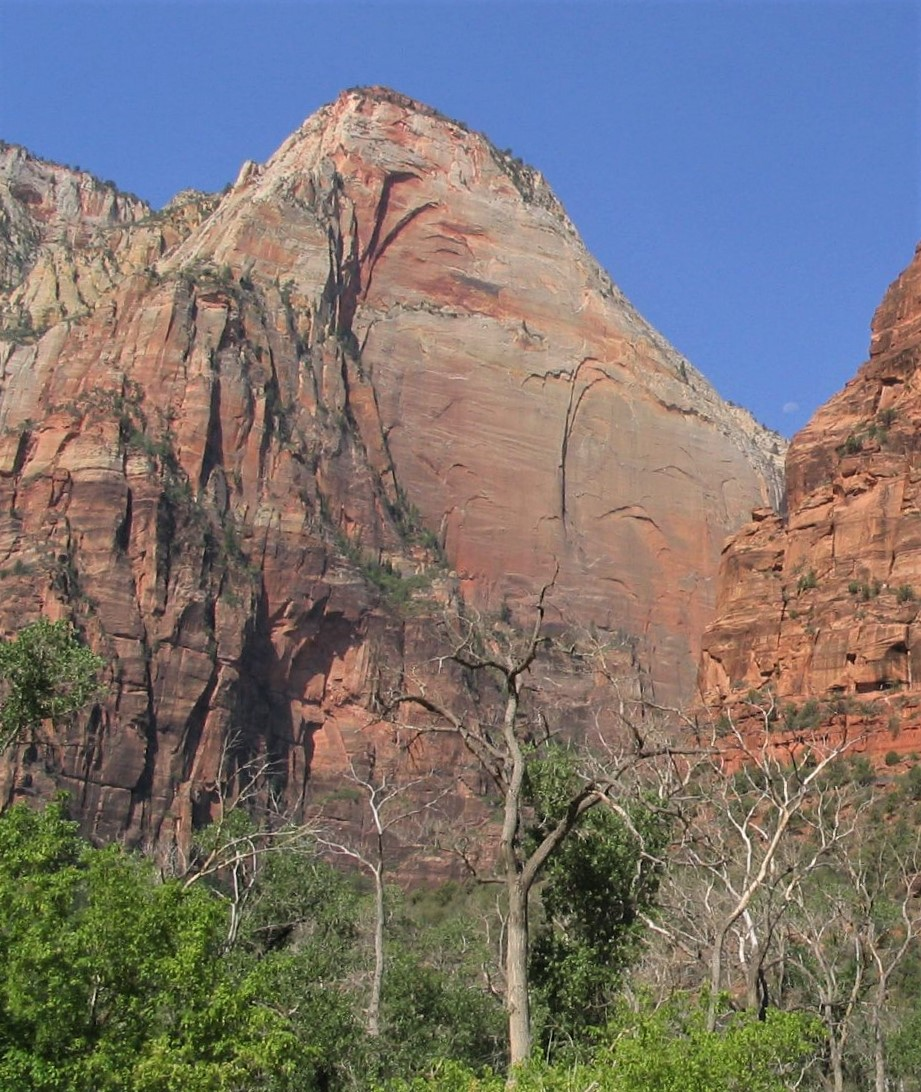
From northeast, featuring the North Face

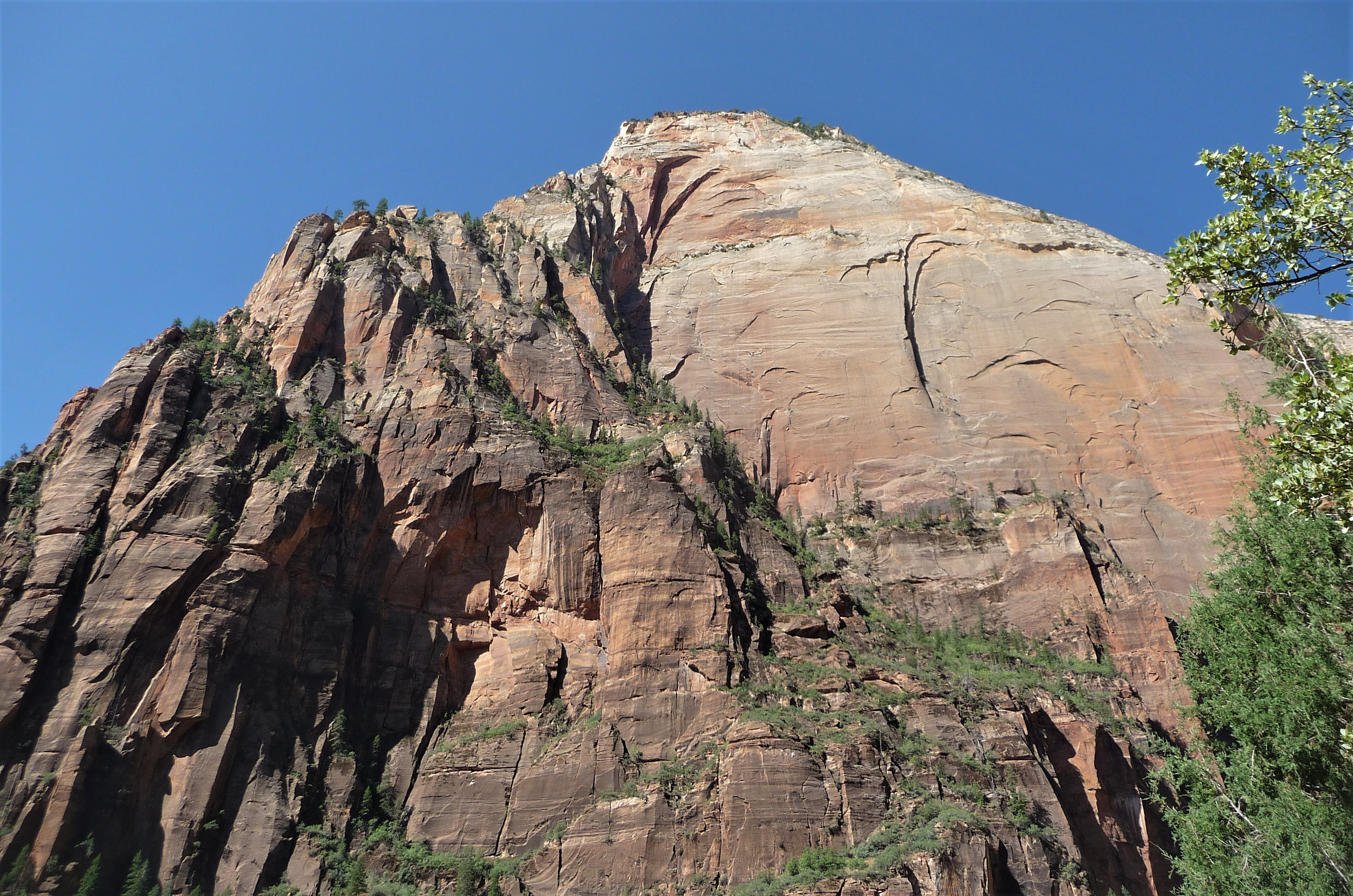
Looking up at North Face from Emerald Pools trail

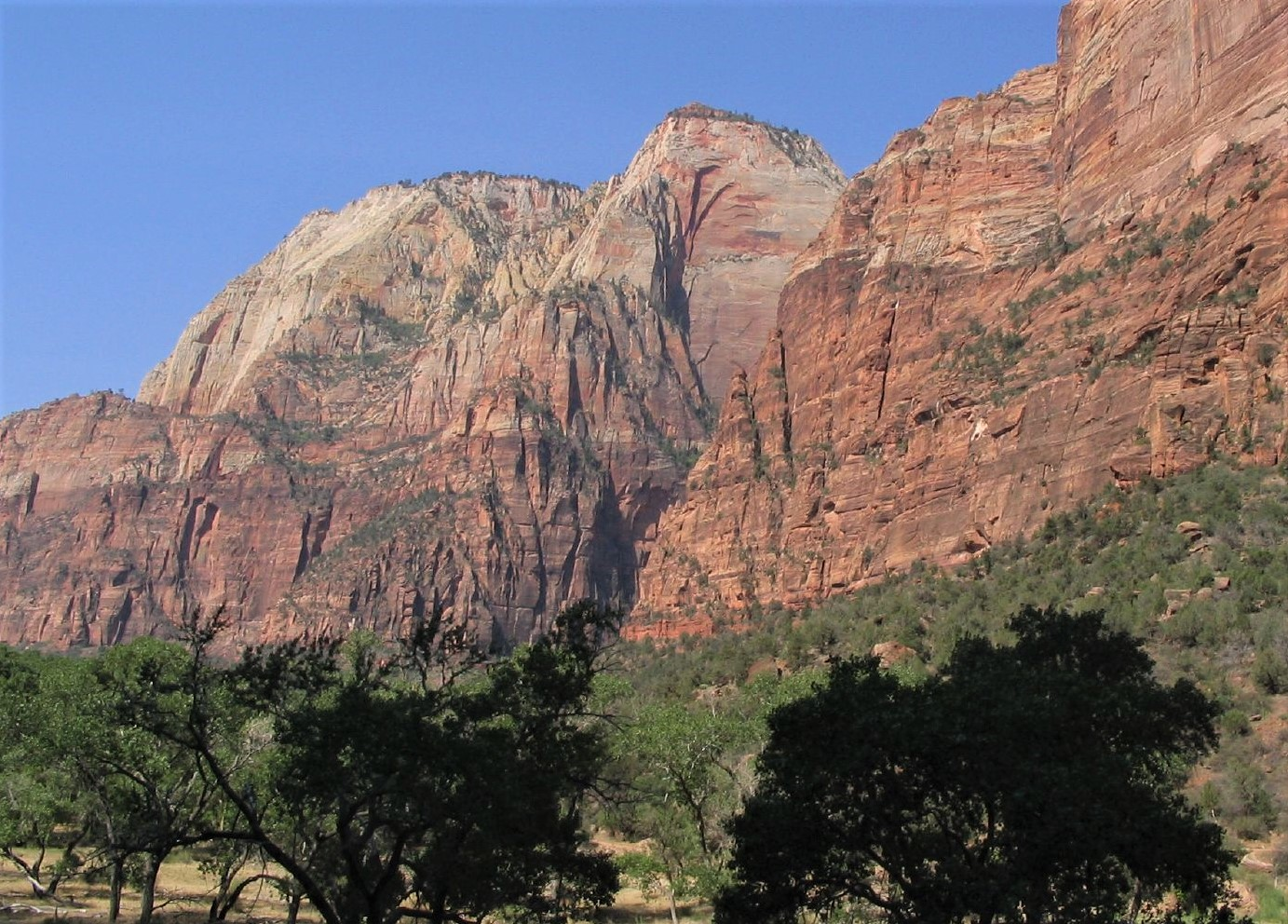
Jacob, Lady Mountain, The Spearhead

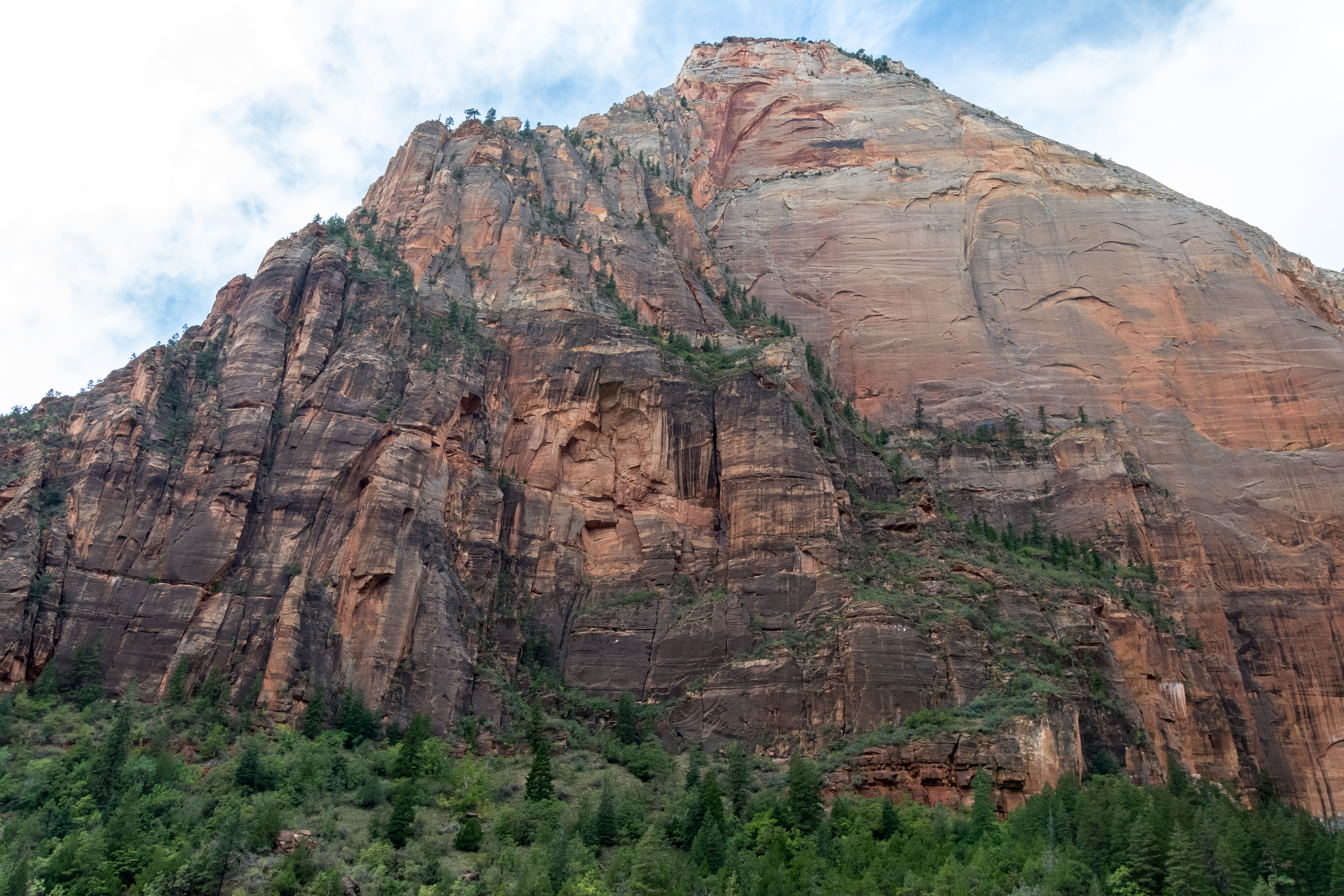
North face

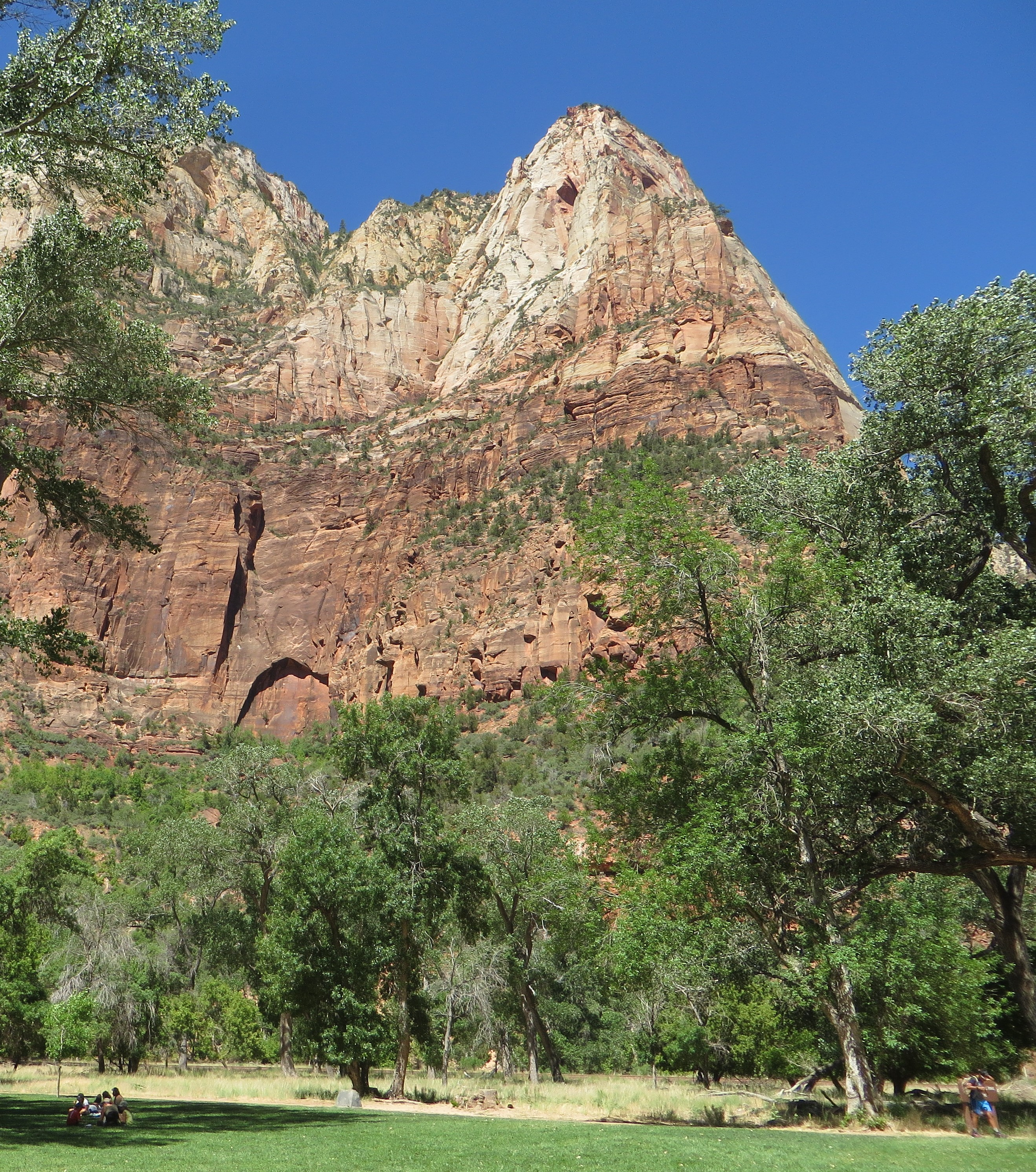
Lady Mountain from Zion Lodge

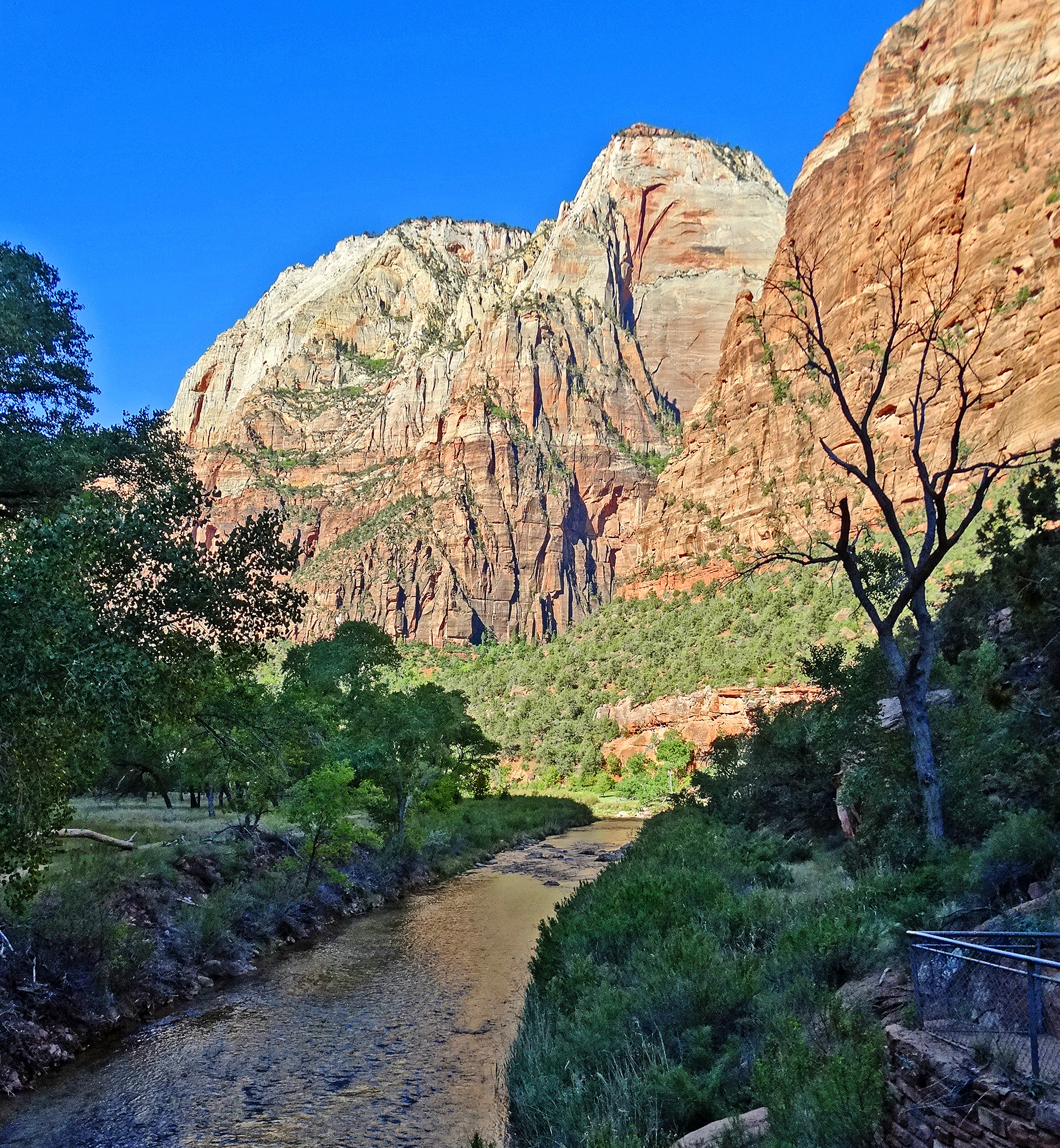
From northeast, with Virgin River

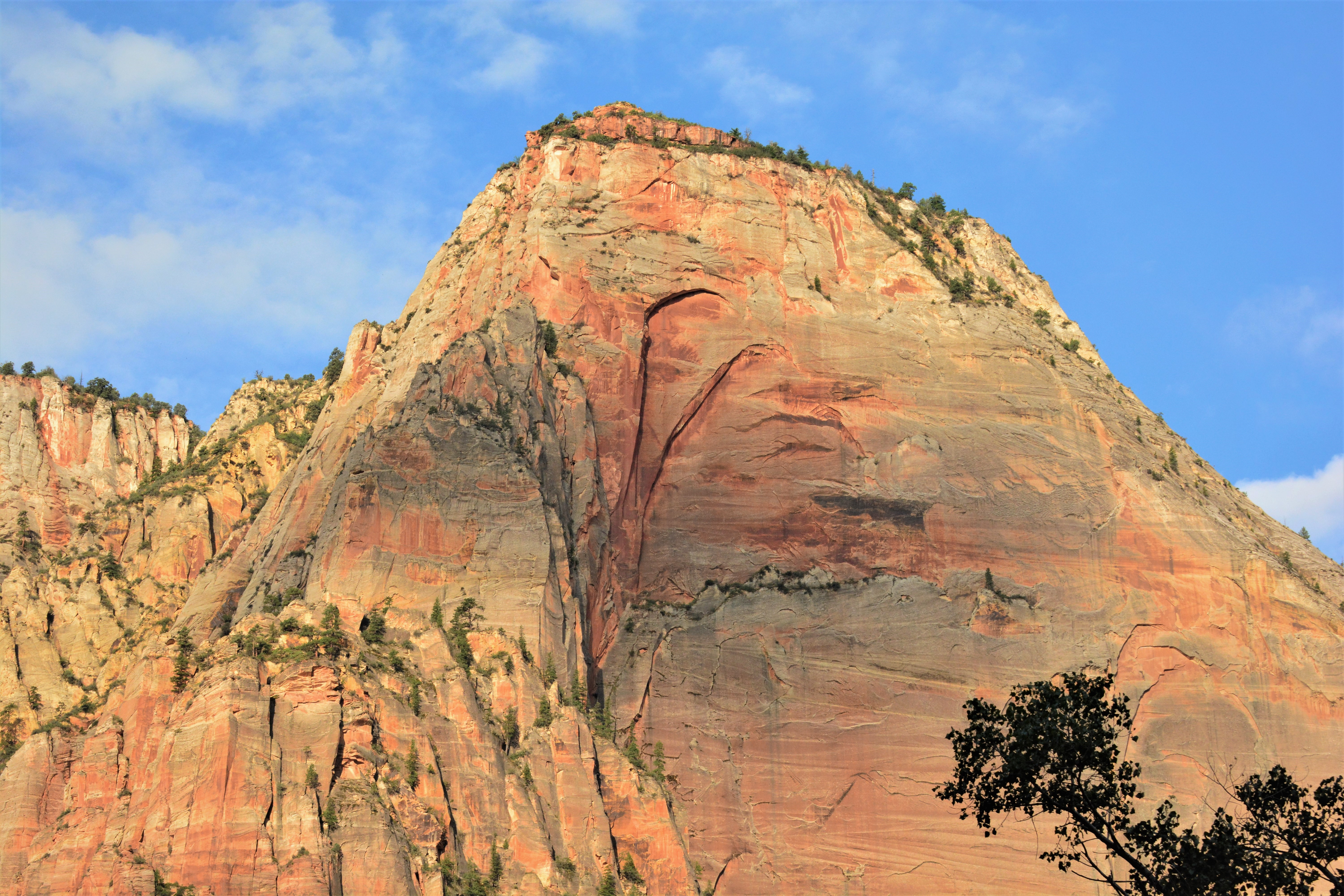
Lady Mountain

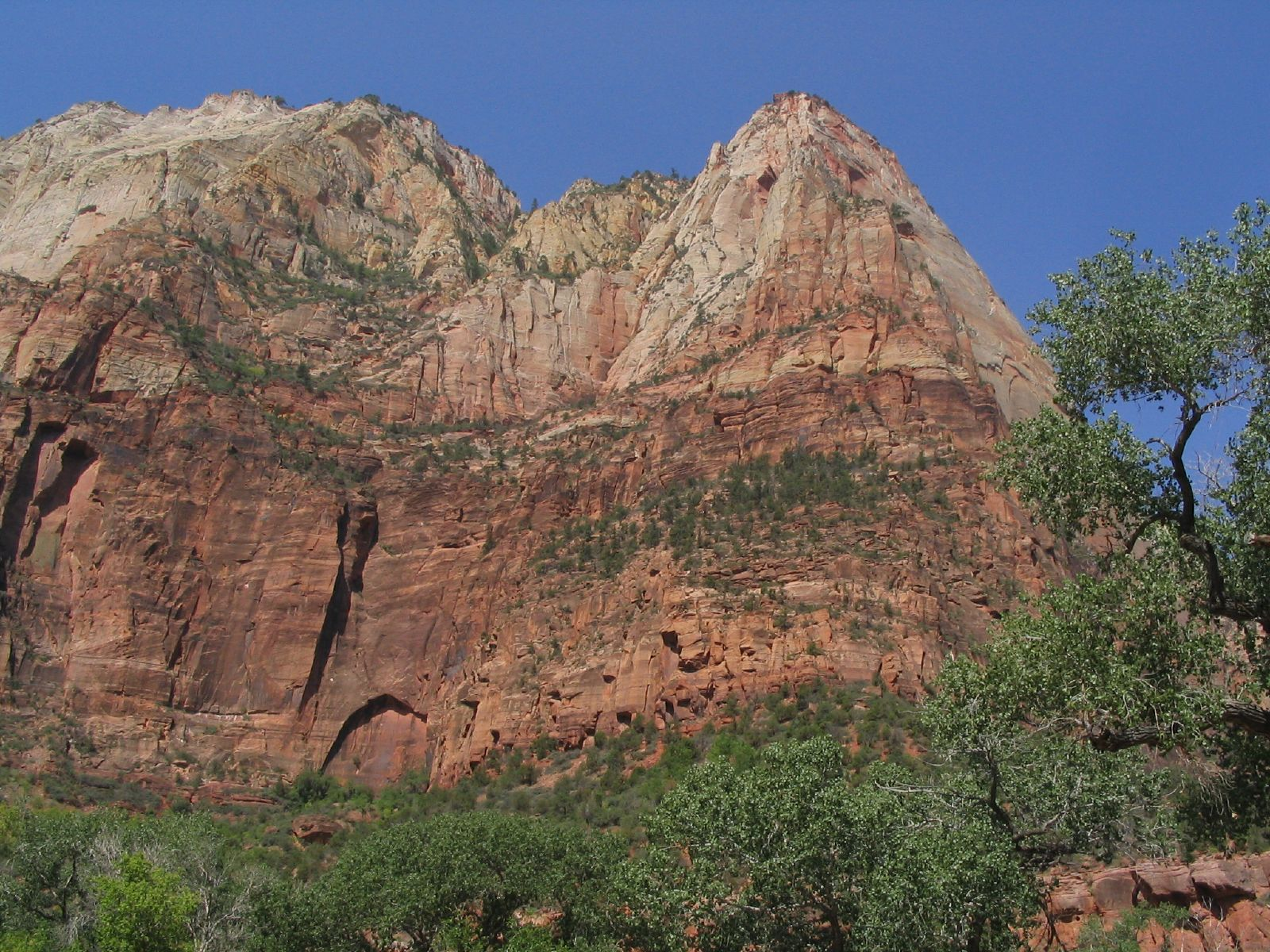
Jacob and Lady from Zion Lodge

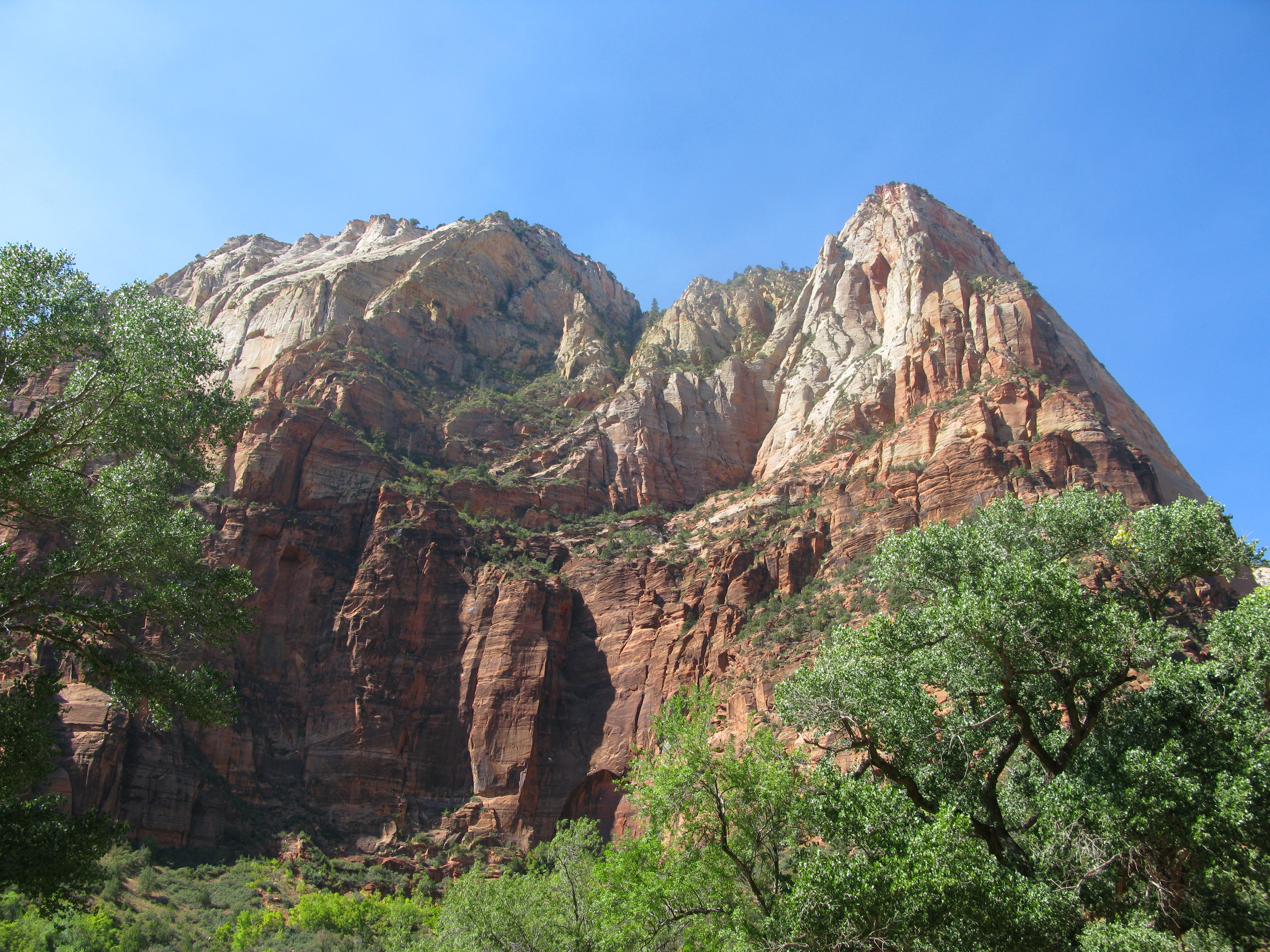
Jacob and Lady from Zion Lodge

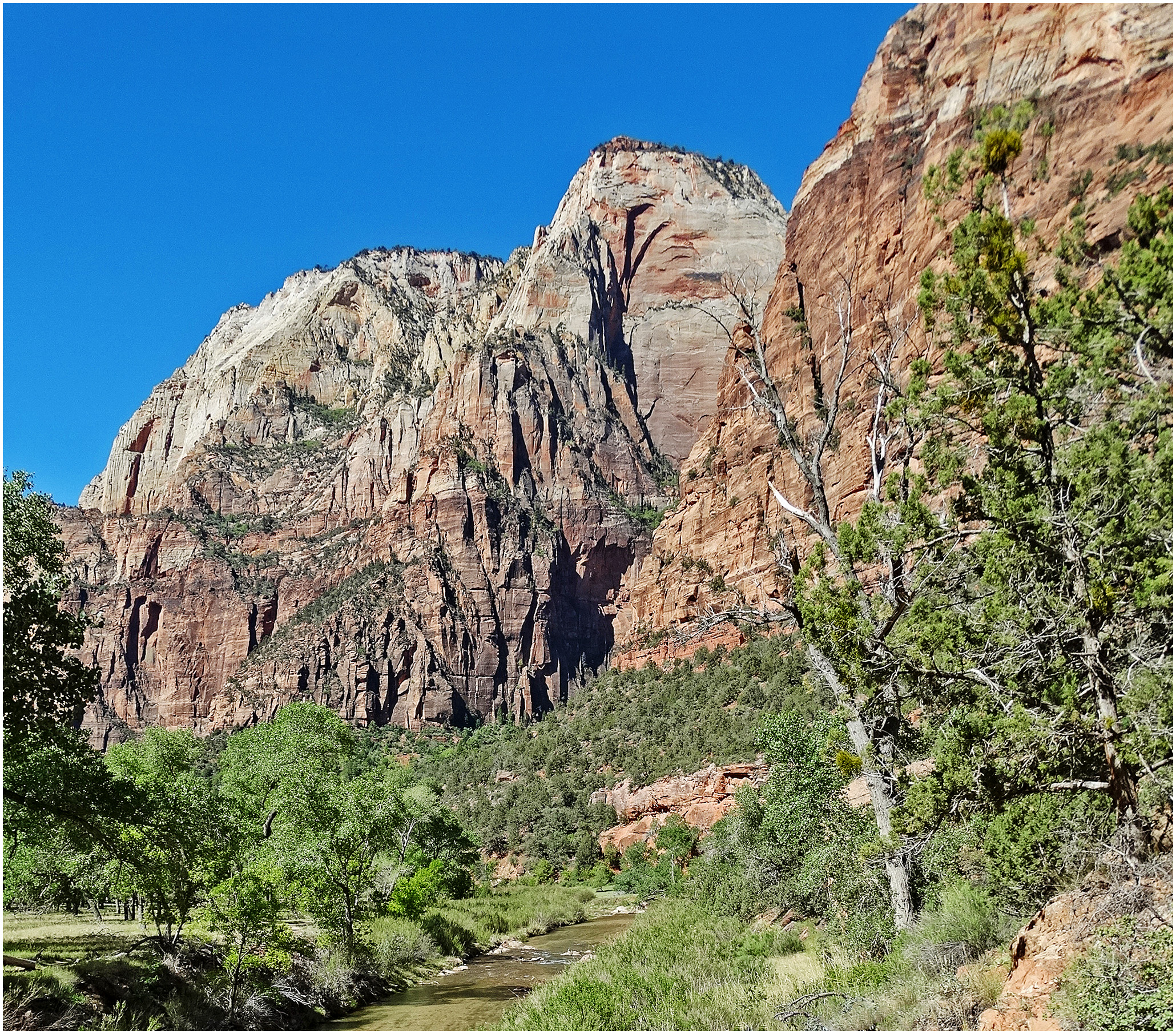
Lady Mountain centered

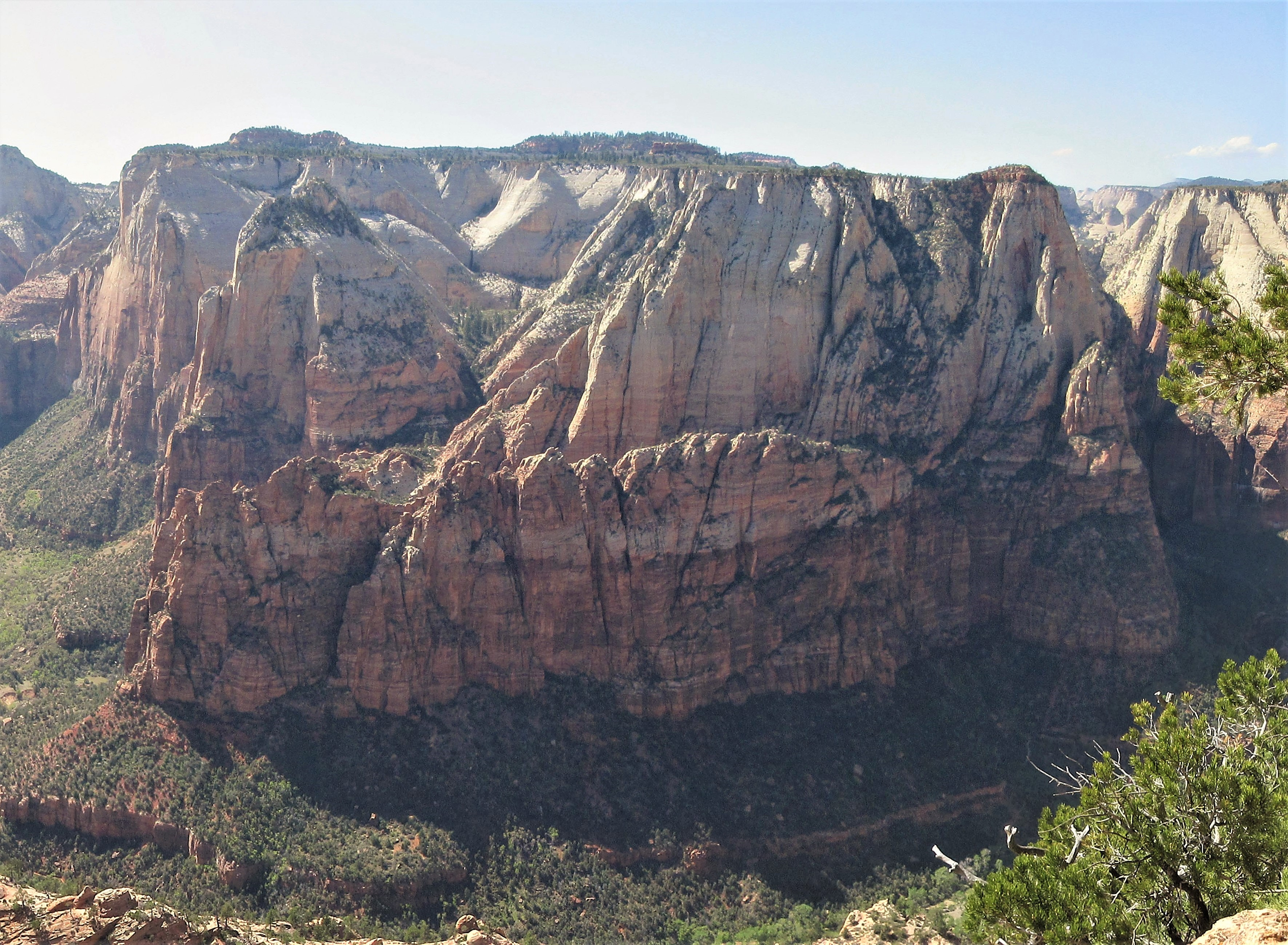
Looking west, Jacob centered, Lady to right, Moroni lower left

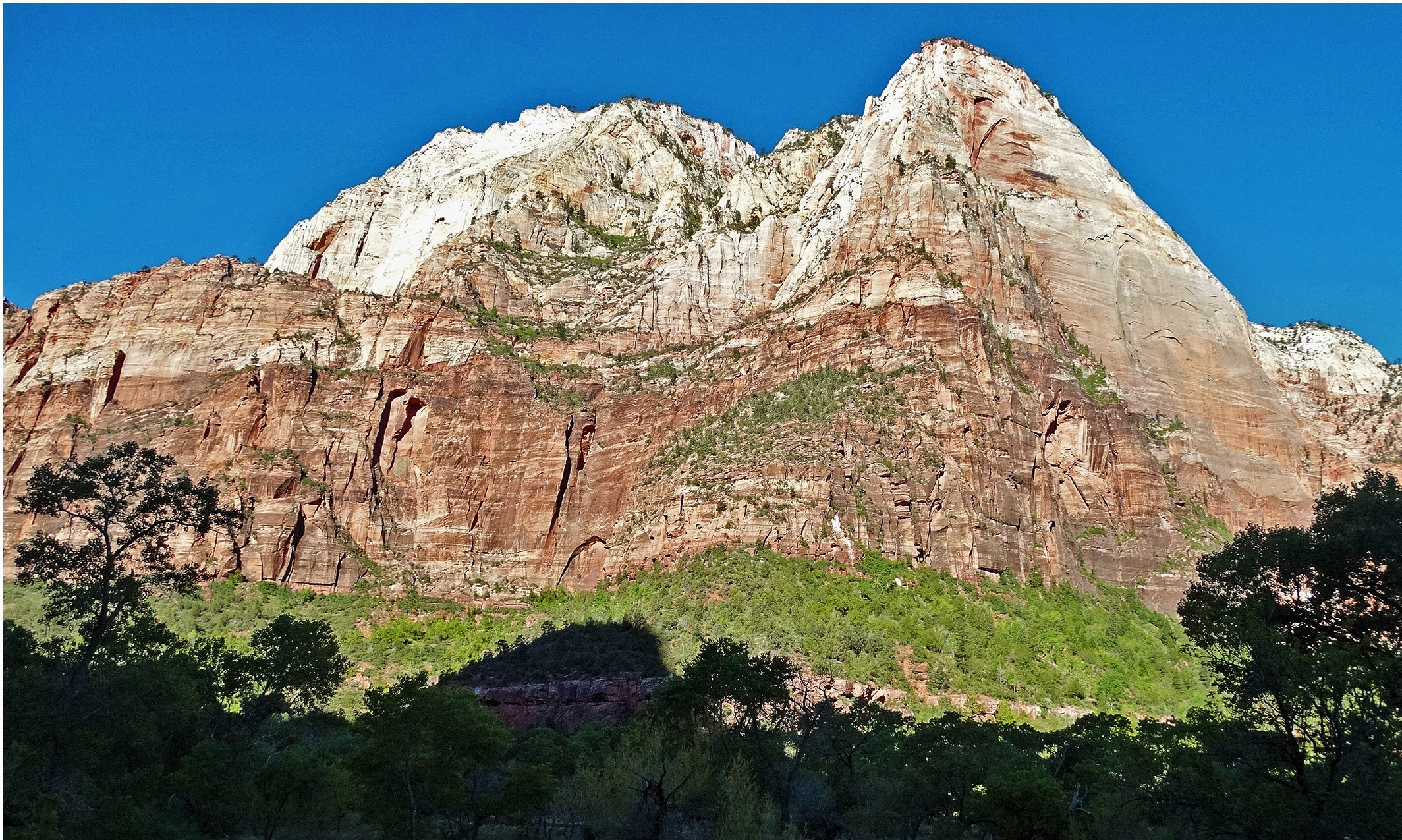
Jacob and Lady

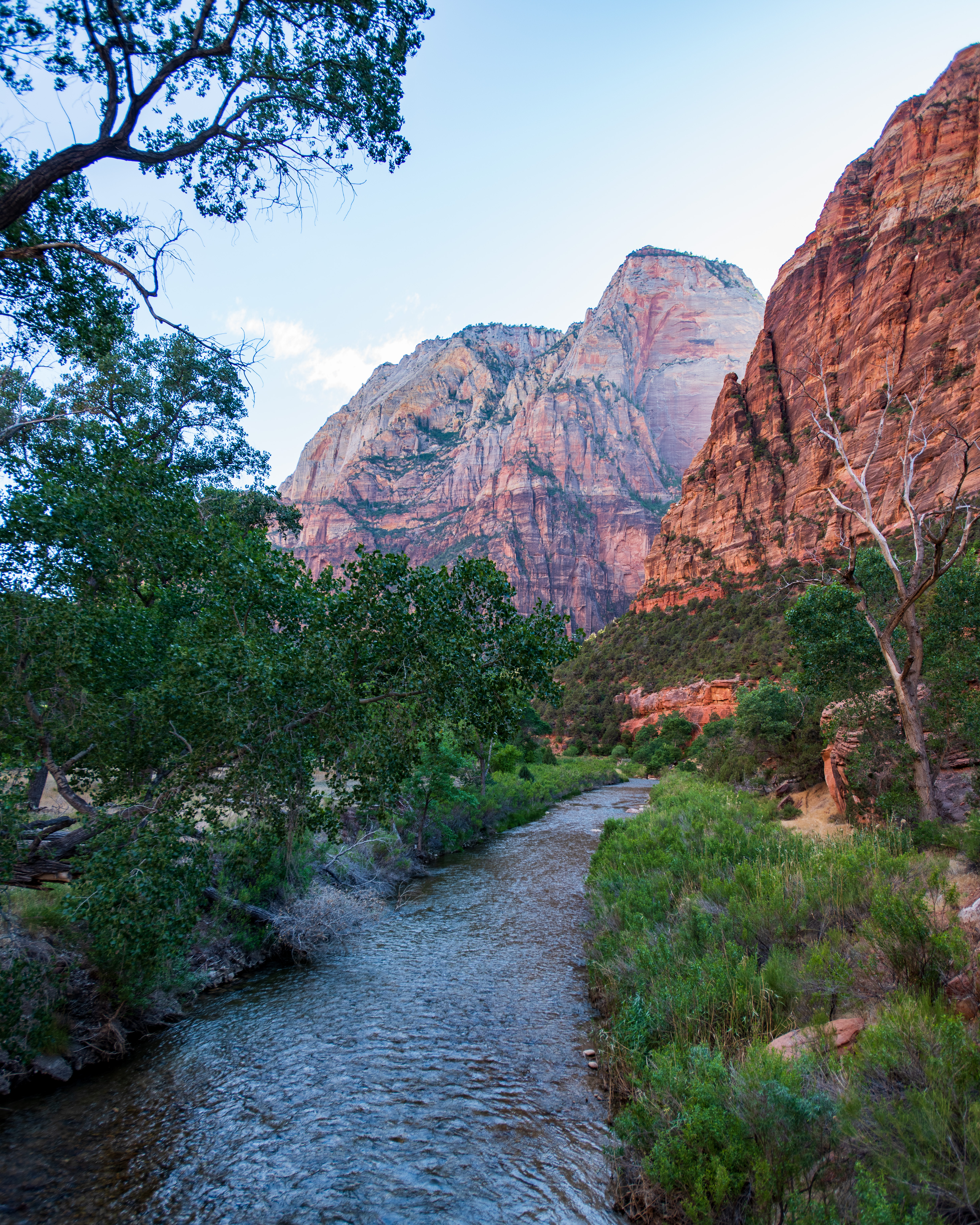

== See also ==
- List of mountains in Utah
- Geology of the Zion and Kolob canyons area
- Colorado Plateau
