= Red Arch Mountain =

Mountain in the state of Utah

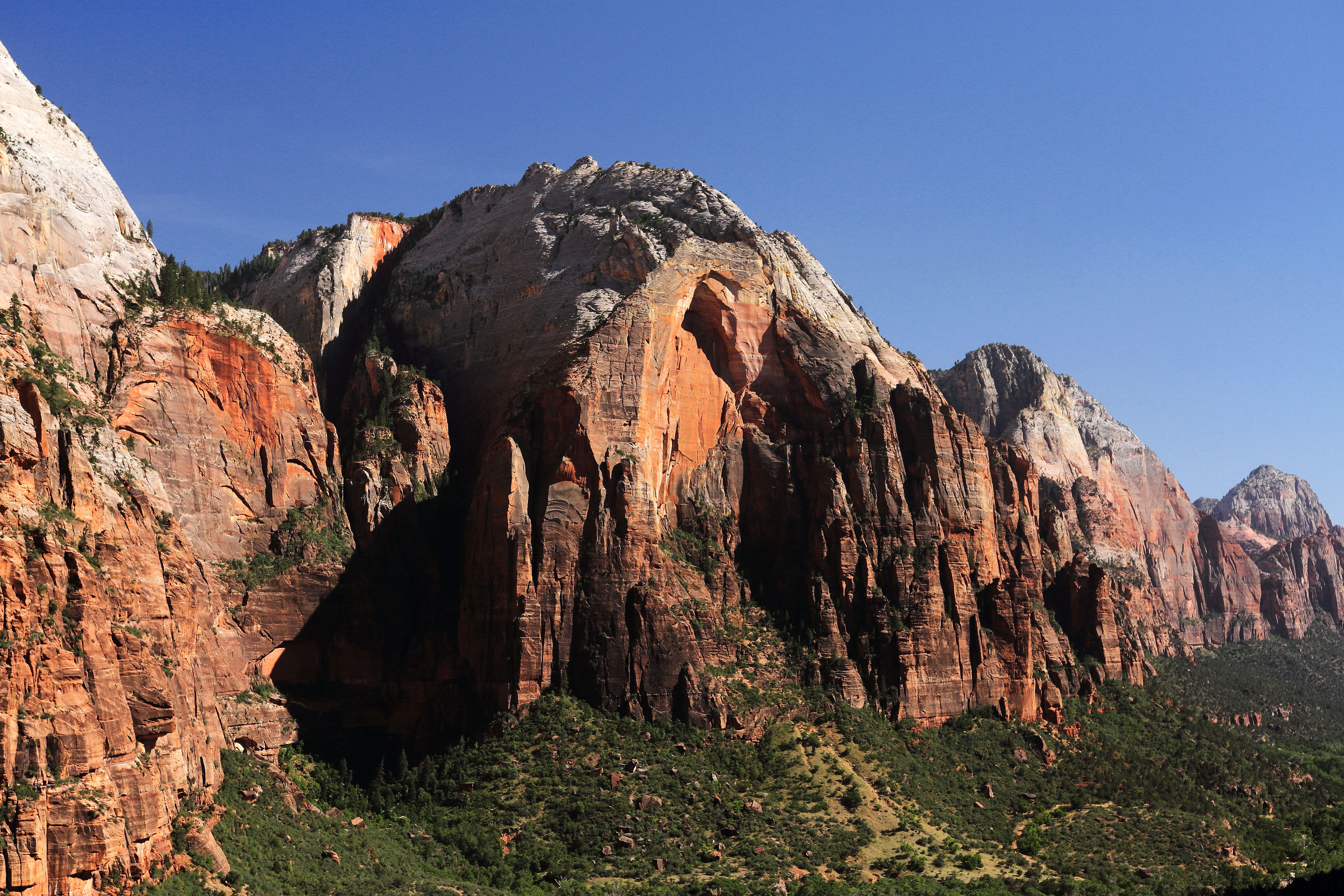
- North aspect, from Angels Landing Trail, July 2019

Highest point
- Elevation: 5,930 ft (1,810 m)
- Prominence: 210 ft (64 m)
- Parent peak: The Great White Throne (6,744 ft)
- Isolation: 0.60 mi (0.97 km)
- Coordinates: 37°15′19″N 112°56′56″W

Geography
- Location within Utah Location within the United States
- Country: United States
- State: Utah
- County: Washington
- Protected area: Zion National Park
- Parent range: Colorado Plateau
- Topo map: USGS Temple of Sinawava

Geology
- Rock age: Jurassic
- Rock type: Navajo sandstone

Red Arch Mountain is a 5,930-foot (1,810 m) elevation Navajo Sandstone summit located in Zion National Park, in Washington County of southwest Utah, United States.

== Description ==
Red Arch Mountain is situated immediately northeast of Zion Lodge, towering 1,700 feet (520 meters) above the lodge and the floor of Zion Canyon. It is set on the east side of the North Fork Virgin River which drains precipitation runoff from this mountain. Its neighbors include Mount Majestic, Cathedral Mountain, The Great White Throne, Mountain of the Sun, Mount Moroni, and Lady Mountain. This mountain's descriptive name was officially adopted in 1934 by the U.S. Board on Geographic Names. It is so named for a blind arch that formed in 1880 on the northwest face when a rock avalanche fell into the valley. This event buried the Gifford farm in rubble. It happened on a Sunday when the family was away at church in Springdale.

== Climate ==
Spring and fall are the most favorable seasons to visit Red Arch Mountain. According to the Köppen climate classification system, it is located in a Cold semi-arid climate zone, which is defined by the coldest month having an average mean temperature below 32 °F (0 °C), and at least 50% of the total annual precipitation being received during the spring and summer. This desert climate receives less than 10 inches (250 millimeters) of annual rainfall, and snowfall is generally light during the winter.

== Gallery ==
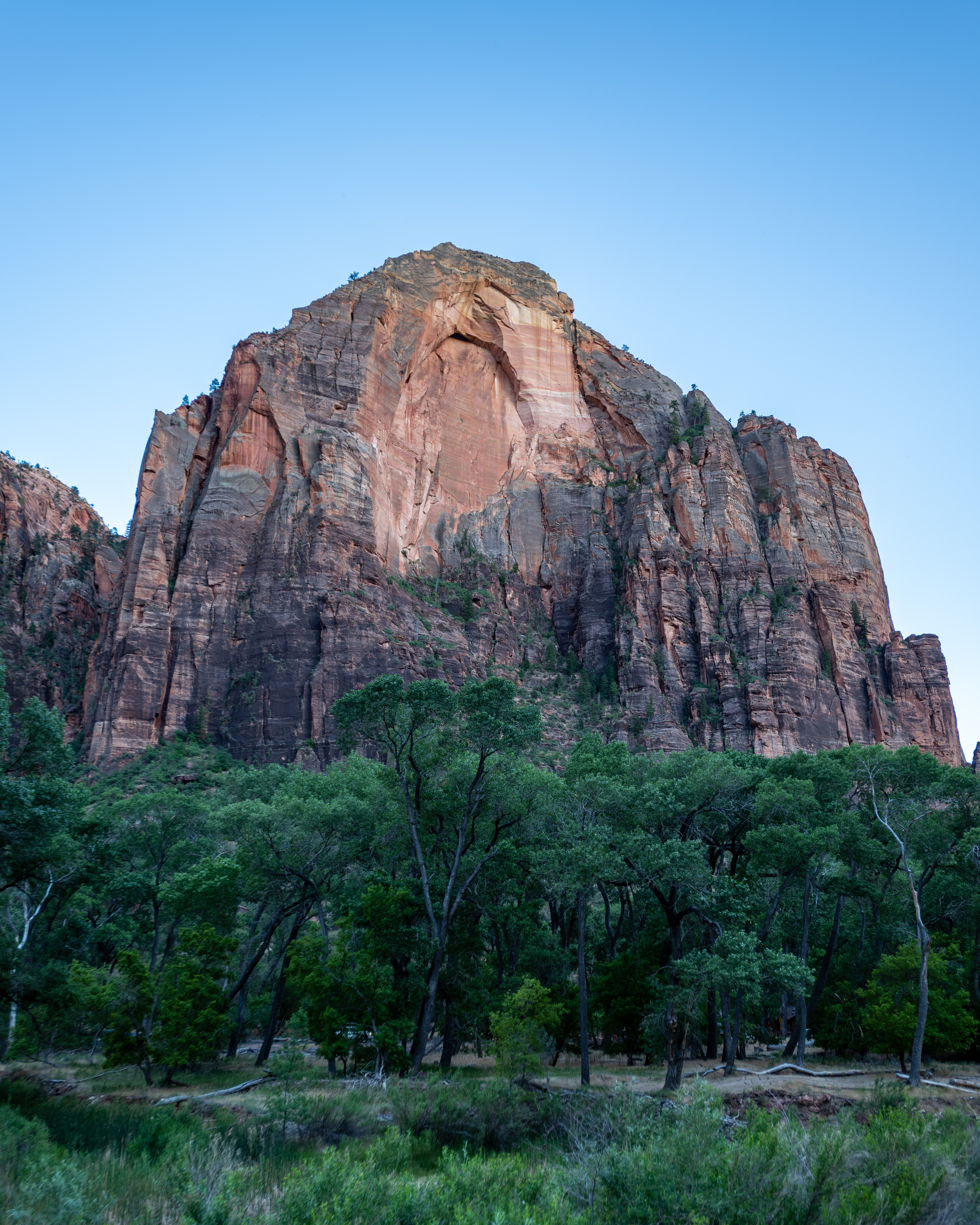
Northwest Face

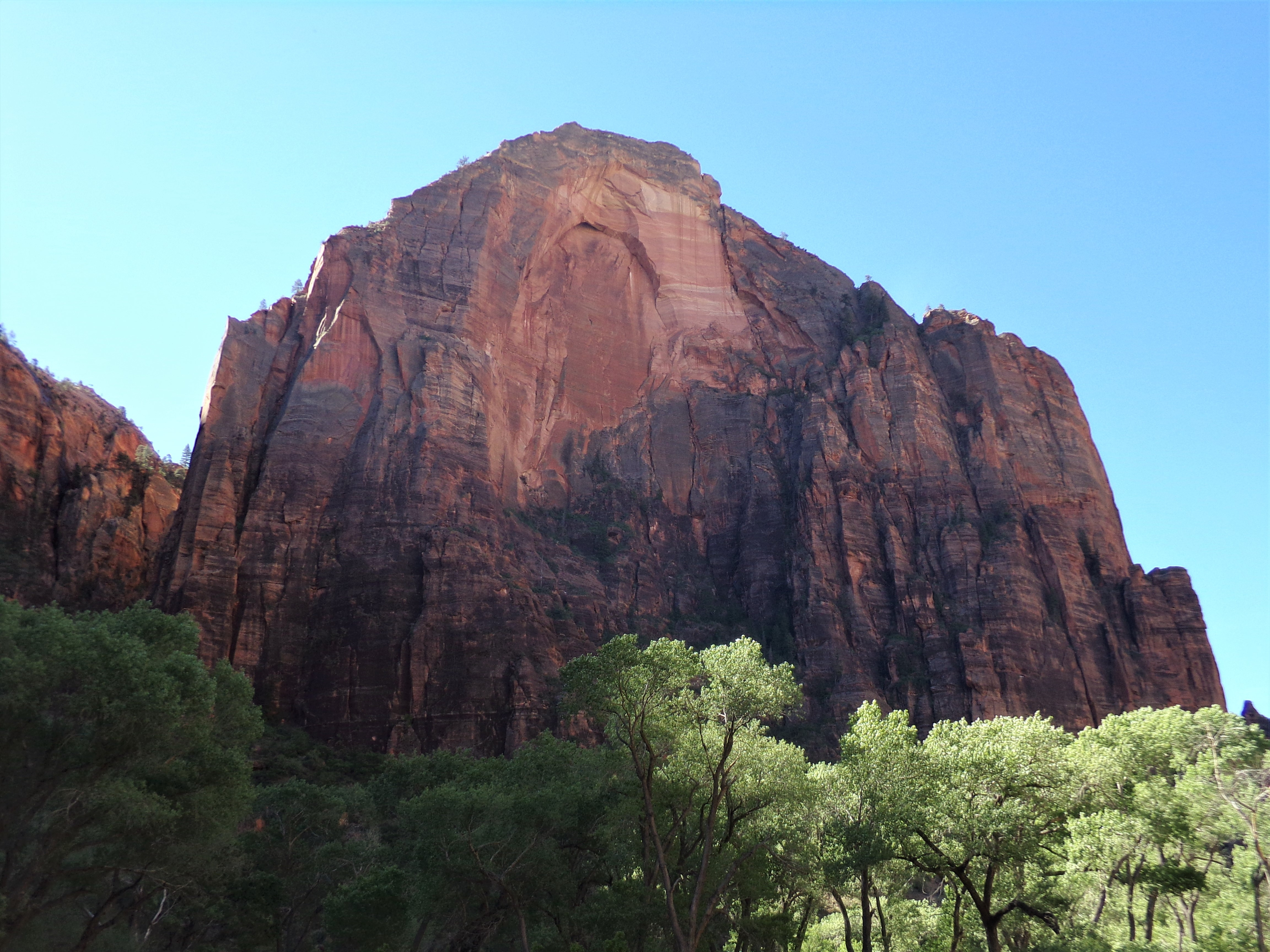
Northwest Face featuring blind arch

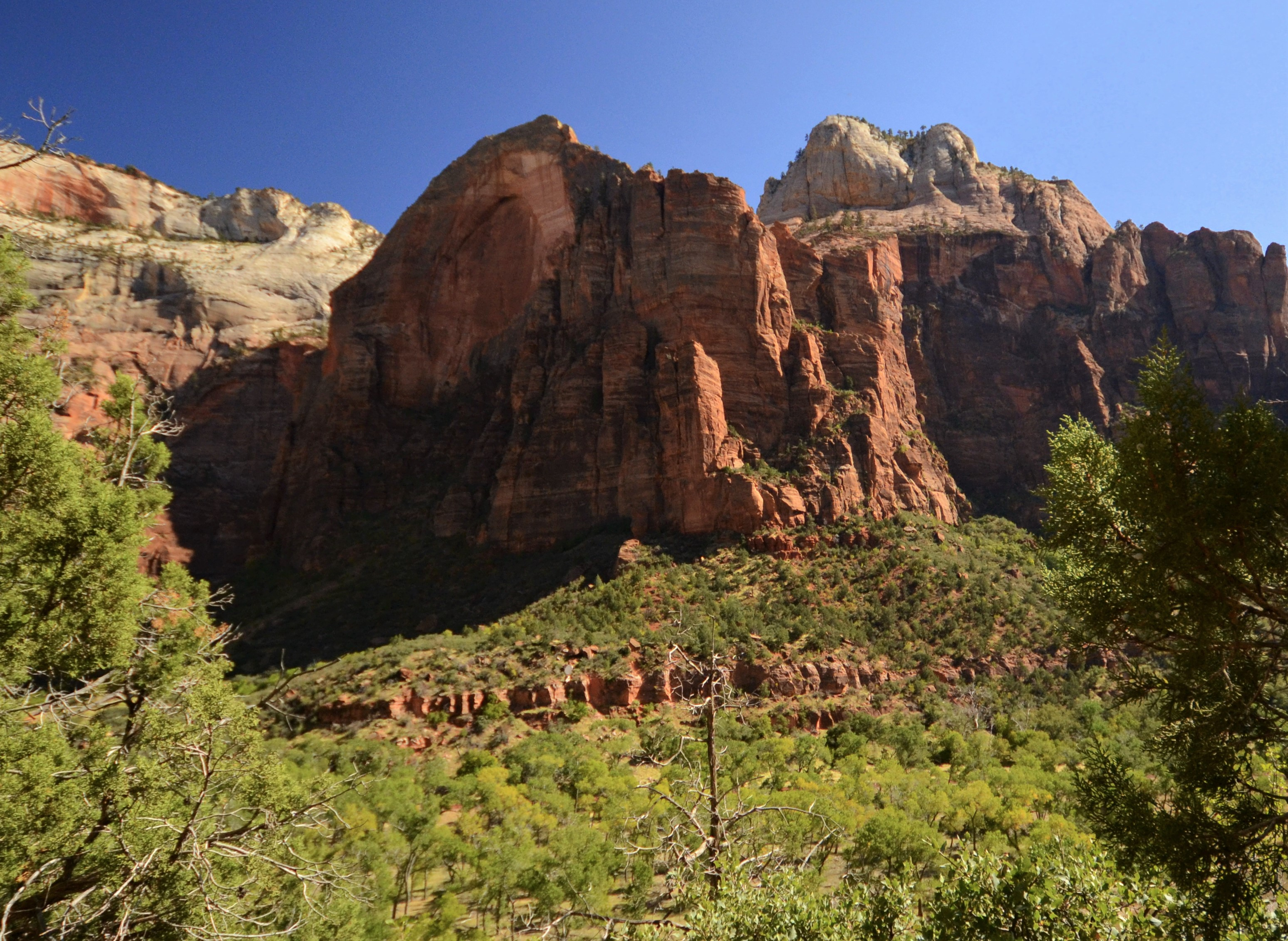
From the northwest

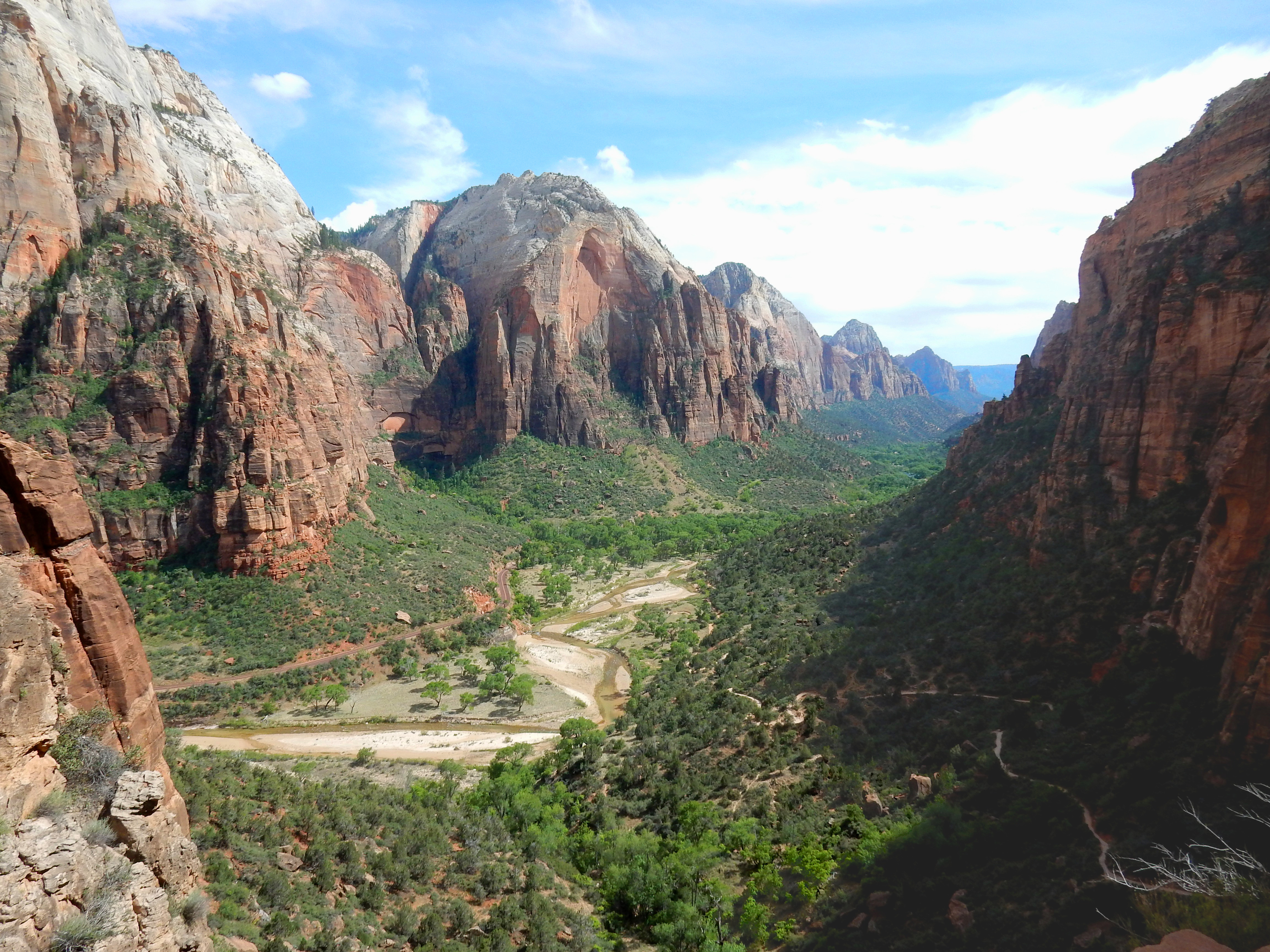
North aspect from Angels Landing area

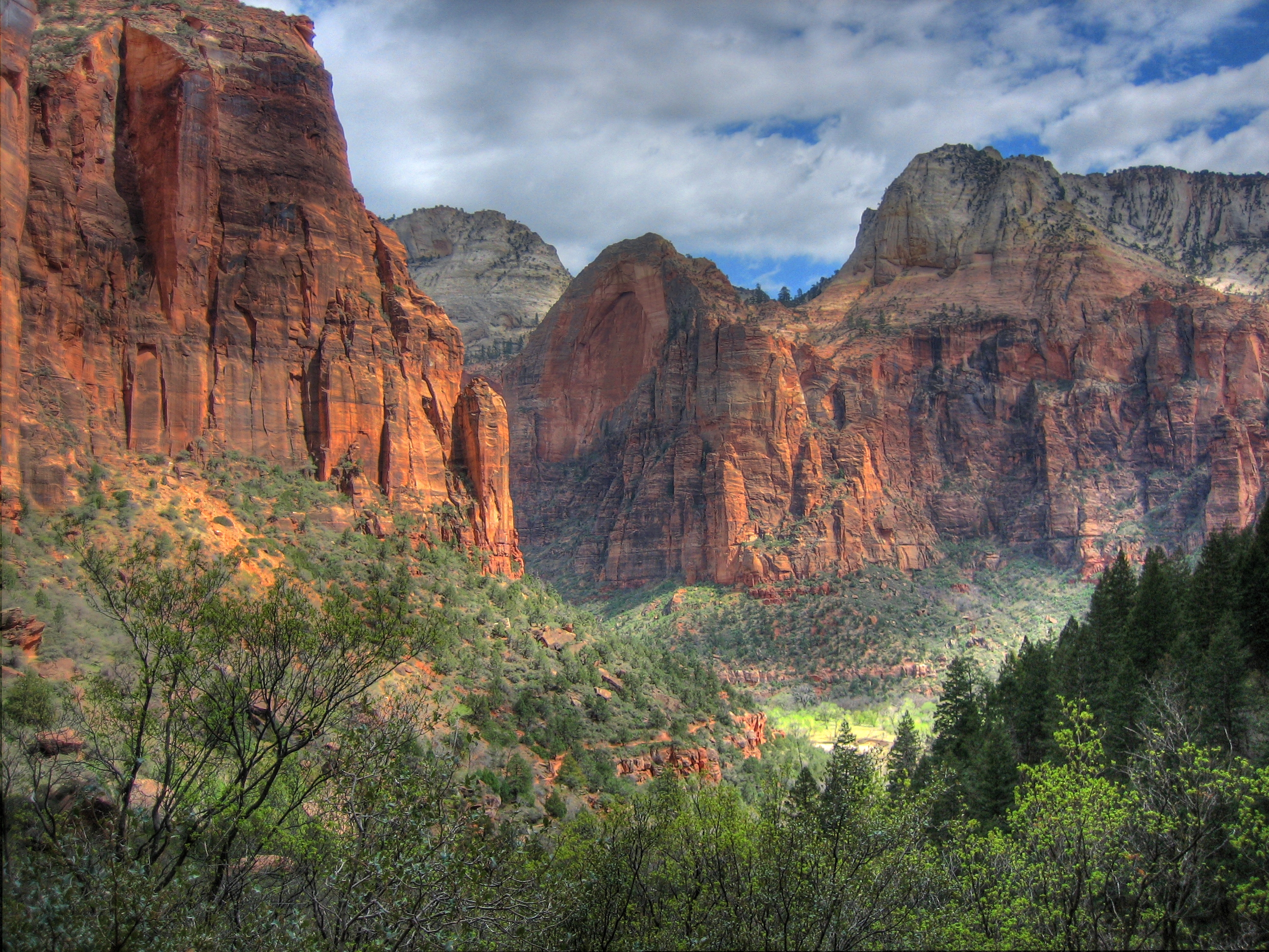
Red Arch Mountain centered. From the west

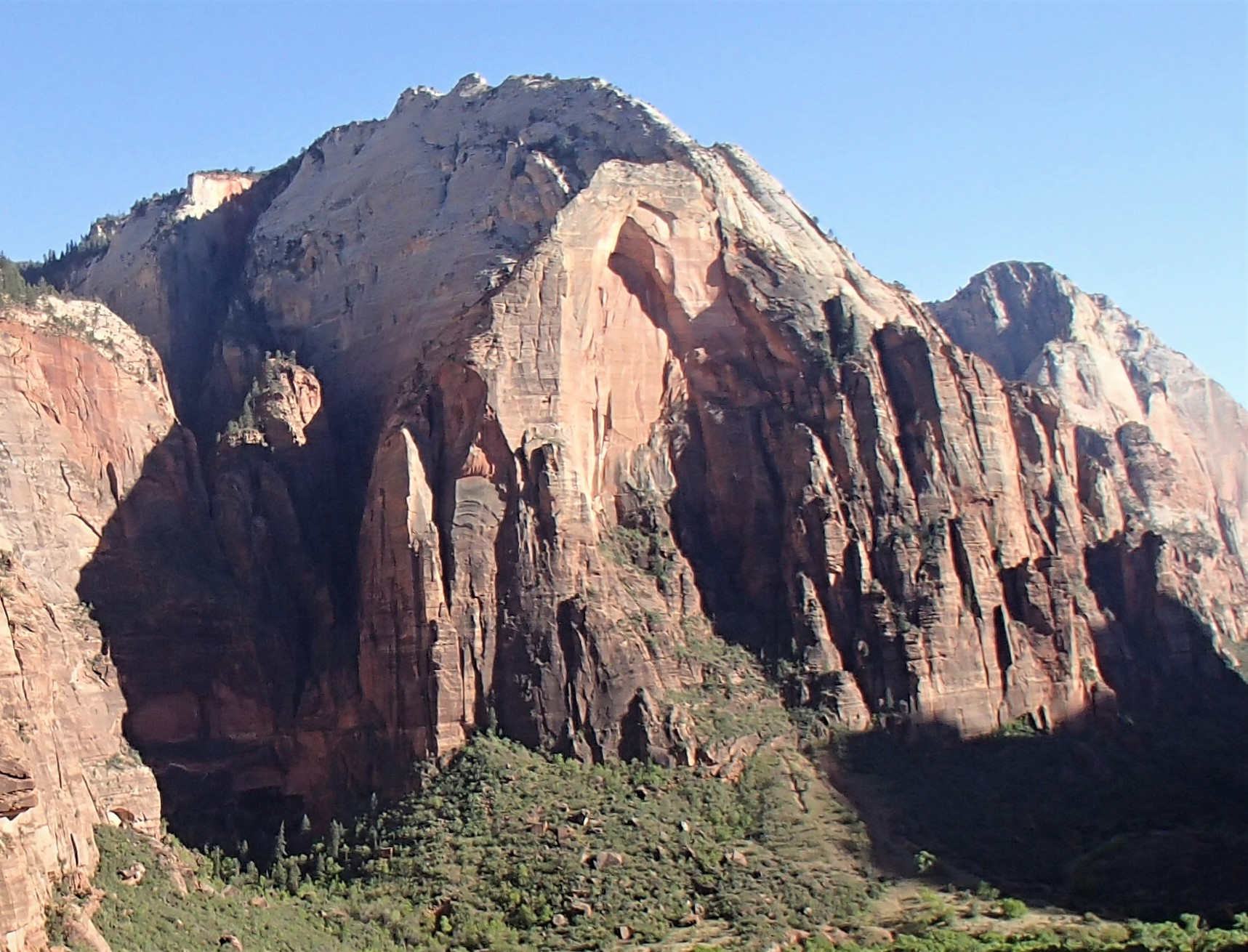
North aspect, with Mountain of the Sun (behind right)

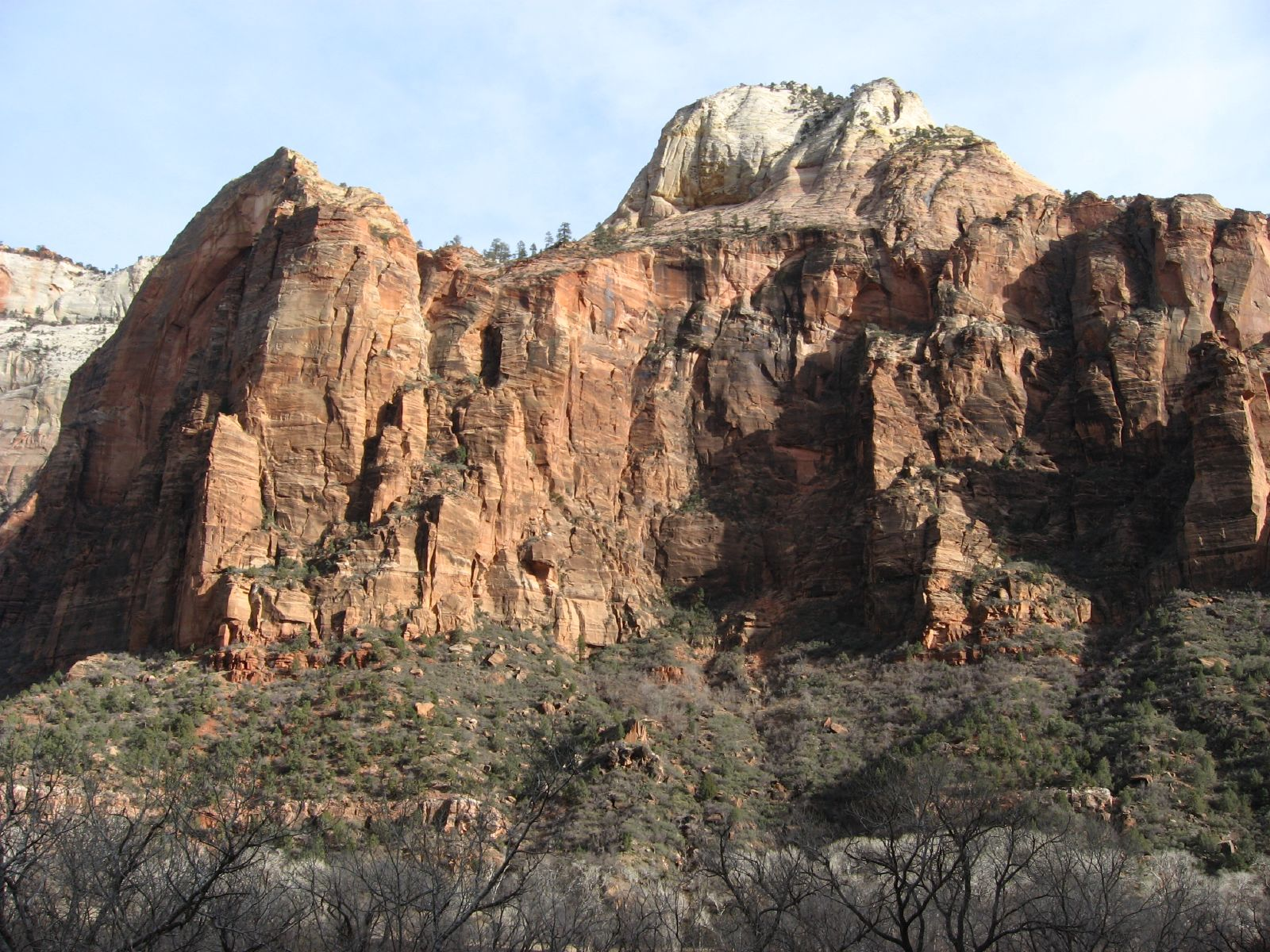
Red Arch Mountain (left) from Emerald Pools Trail

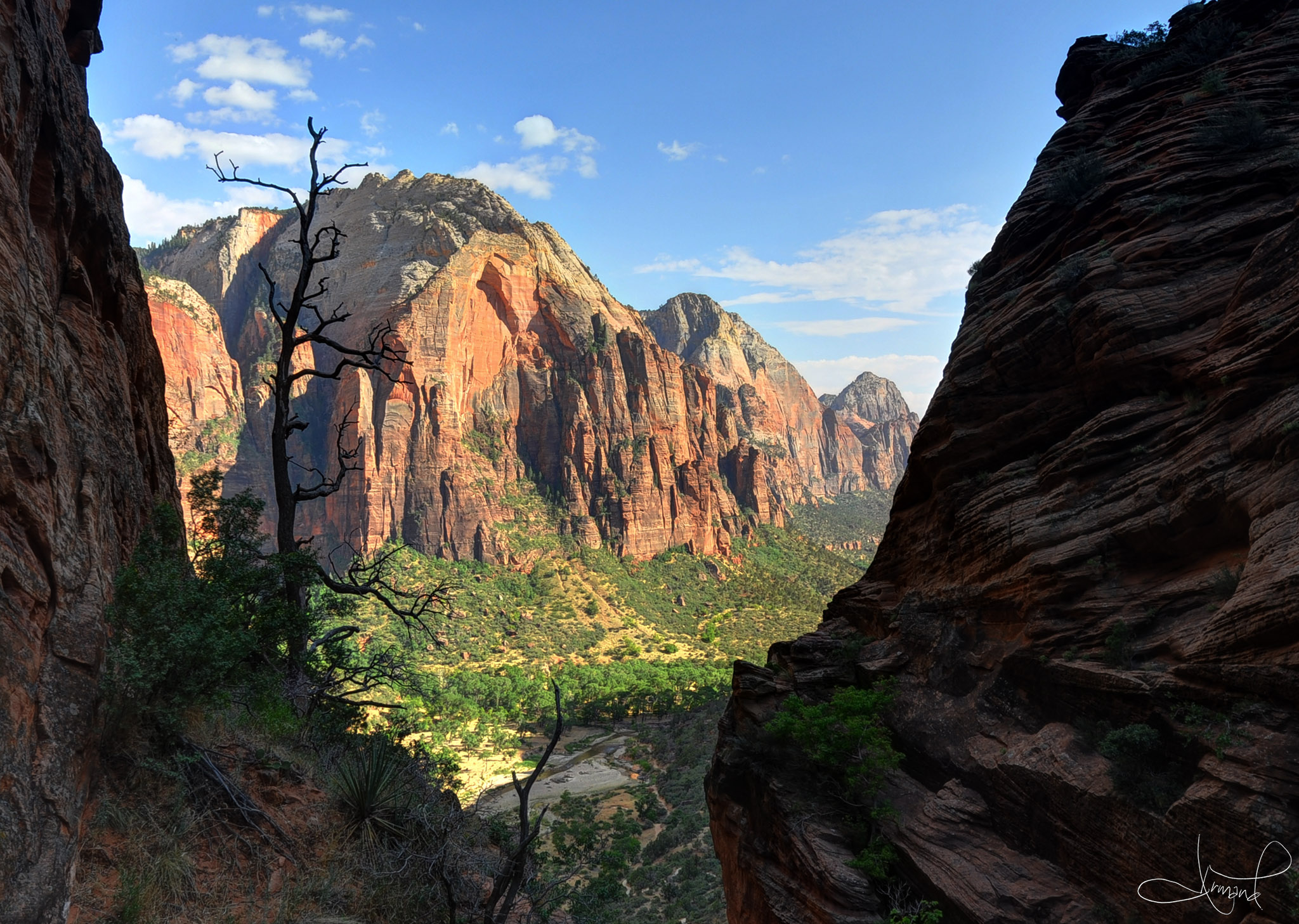

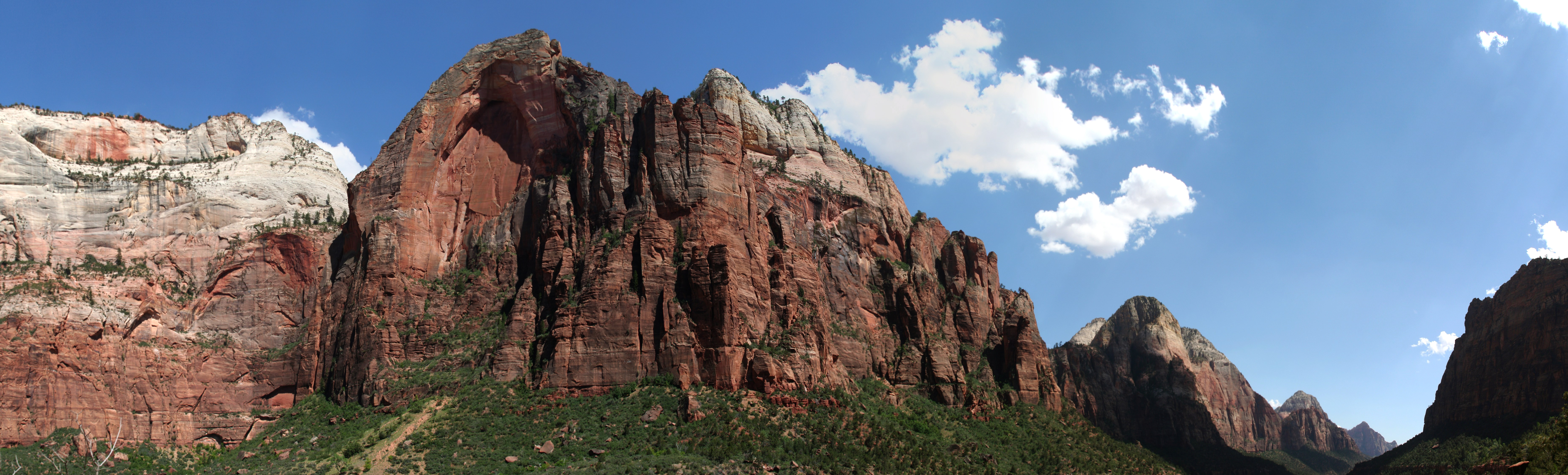

== See also ==
- List of mountains in Utah
- Geology of the Zion and Kolob canyons area
- Colorado Plateau
