= Mount Majestic (Utah) =

Mountain in the state of Utah

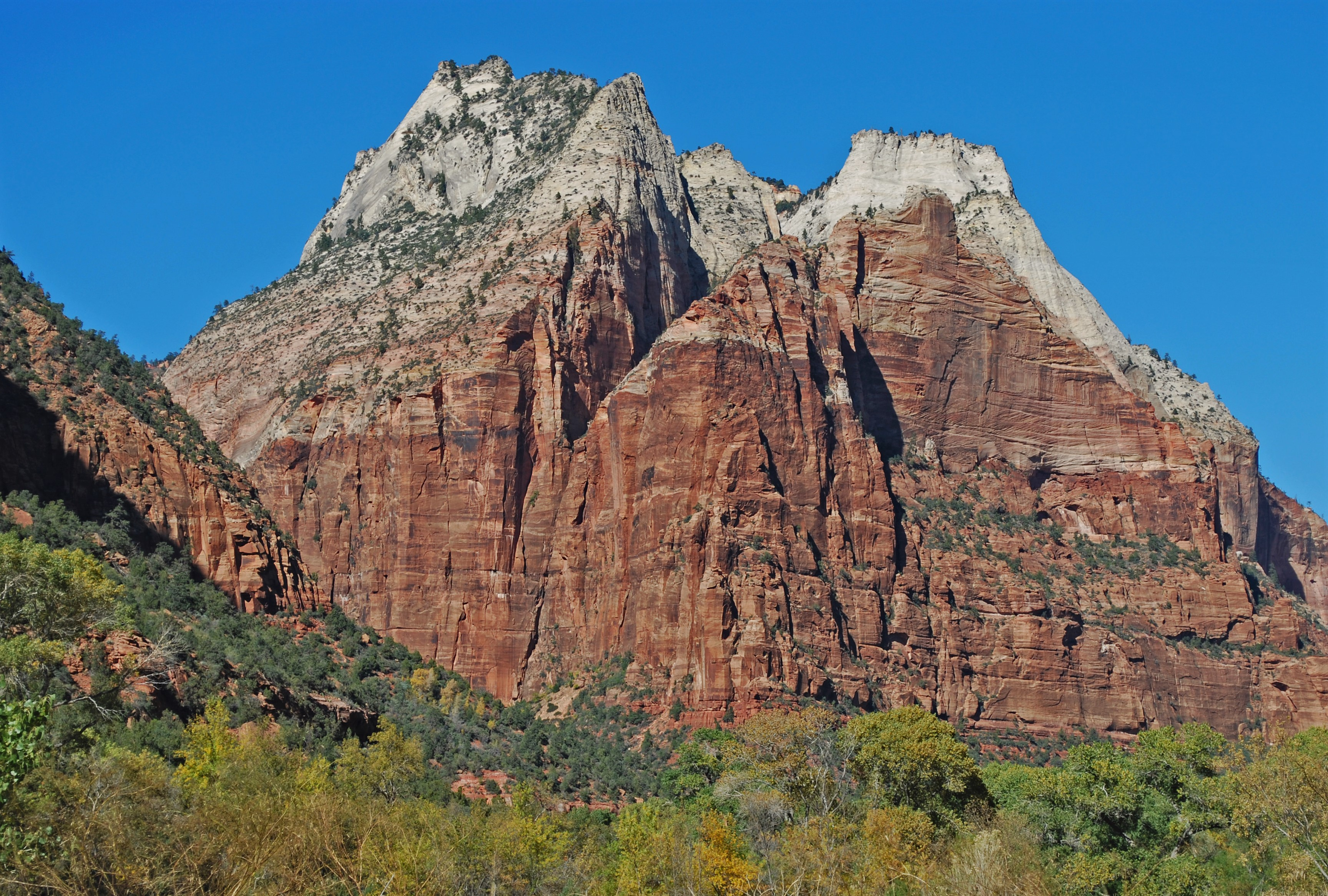
- Mount Majestic (left), from the south. (Cathedral Mountain right), November 2014

Highest point
- Elevation: 6,956 ft (2,120 m)
- Prominence: 636 ft (194 m)
- Parent peak: Castle Dome (7,060 ft)
- Isolation: 0.69 mi (1.11 km)
- Coordinates: 37°16′29″N 112°57′45″W

Geography
- Location within Utah Location within the United States
- Country: United States
- State: Utah
- County: Washington
- Protected area: Zion National Park
- Parent range: Colorado Plateau
- Topo map: USGS Temple of Sinawava

Geology
- Rock age: Jurassic
- Rock type: Navajo sandstone

Climbing
- Easiest route: class 5.4 climbing

Mount Majestic, also known as Majestic Mountain, is a 6,956-foot (2,120 m) elevation Navajo Sandstone double-summit mountain located in Zion National Park, in Washington County of southwest Utah, United States.

== Description ==
Mount Majestic is situated near the north end of Zion Canyon, towering 2,600 feet (790 meters) above the canyon floor and the North Fork Virgin River, which drains precipitation runoff from this mountain. Majestic is the parent to Cathedral Mountain, with only 0.24 mile of separation between them. Other neighbors include The Great White Throne, Observation Point, Red Arch Mountain, Lady Mountain, Castle Dome, Cable Mountain, and Angels Landing. This feature's name was officially adopted in 1934 by the U.S. Board on Geographic Names.

== Climate ==
Spring and fall are the most favorable seasons to visit Mount Majestic. According to the Köppen climate classification system, it is located in a Cold semi-arid climate zone, which is defined by the coldest month having an average mean temperature below 32 °F (0 °C), and at least 50% of the total annual precipitation being received during the spring and summer. This desert climate receives less than 10 inches (250 millimeters) of annual rainfall, and snowfall is generally light during the winter.

== Gallery ==
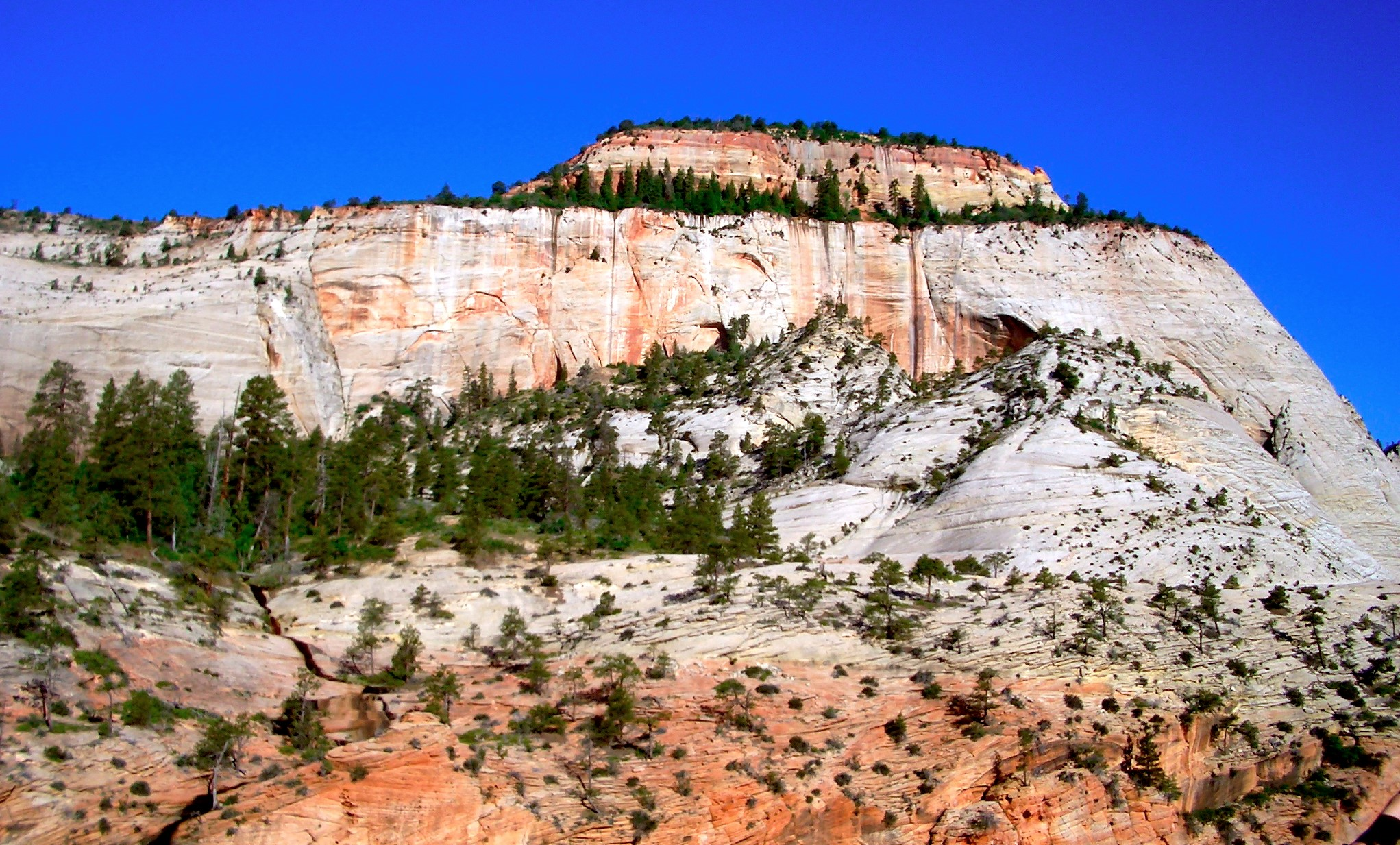
The north end (6,955-ft secondary summit) of Mount Majestic

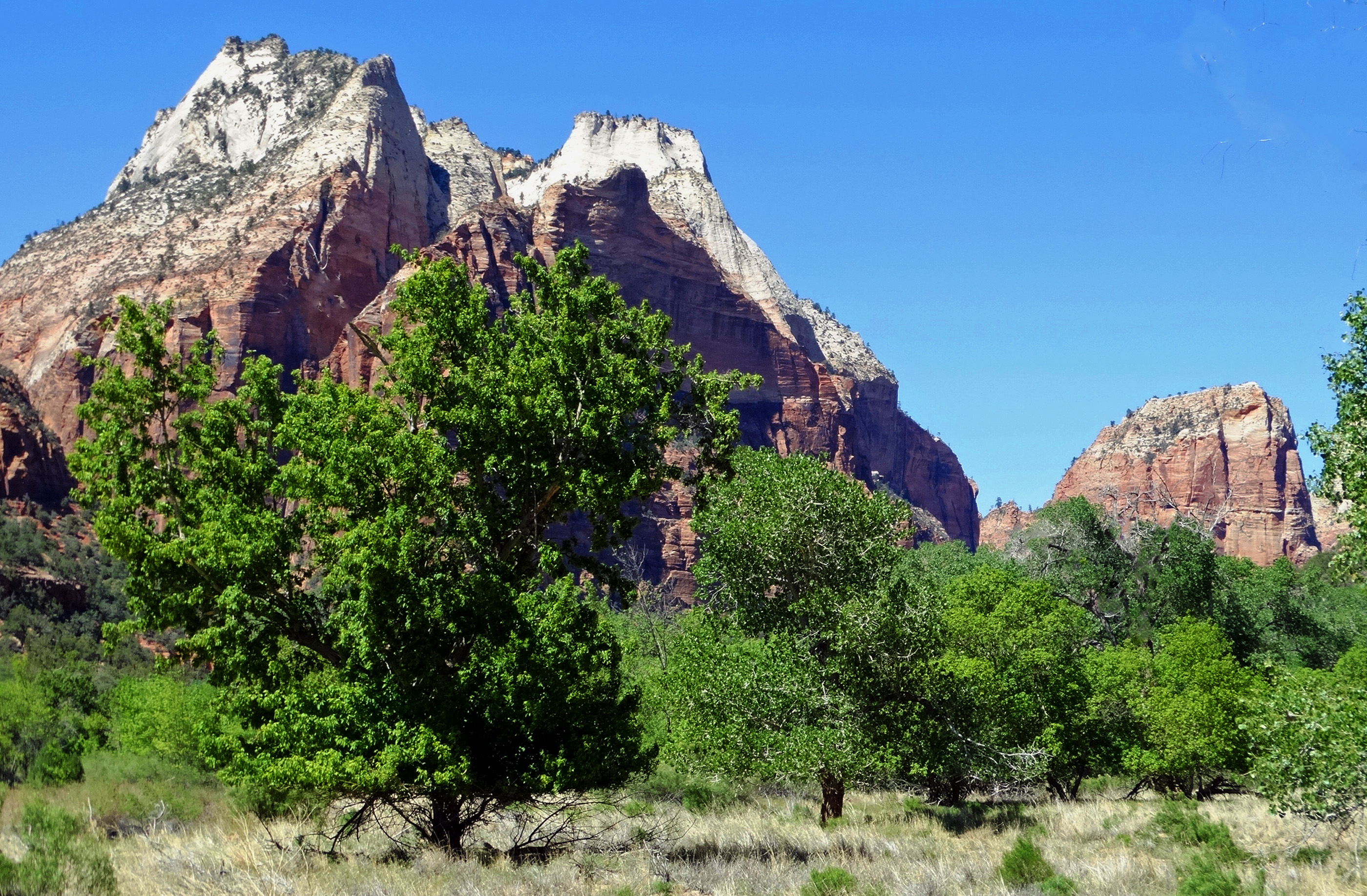
Mount Majestic, upper left, from the south.
(Cathedral Mountain center, Angels Landing right)

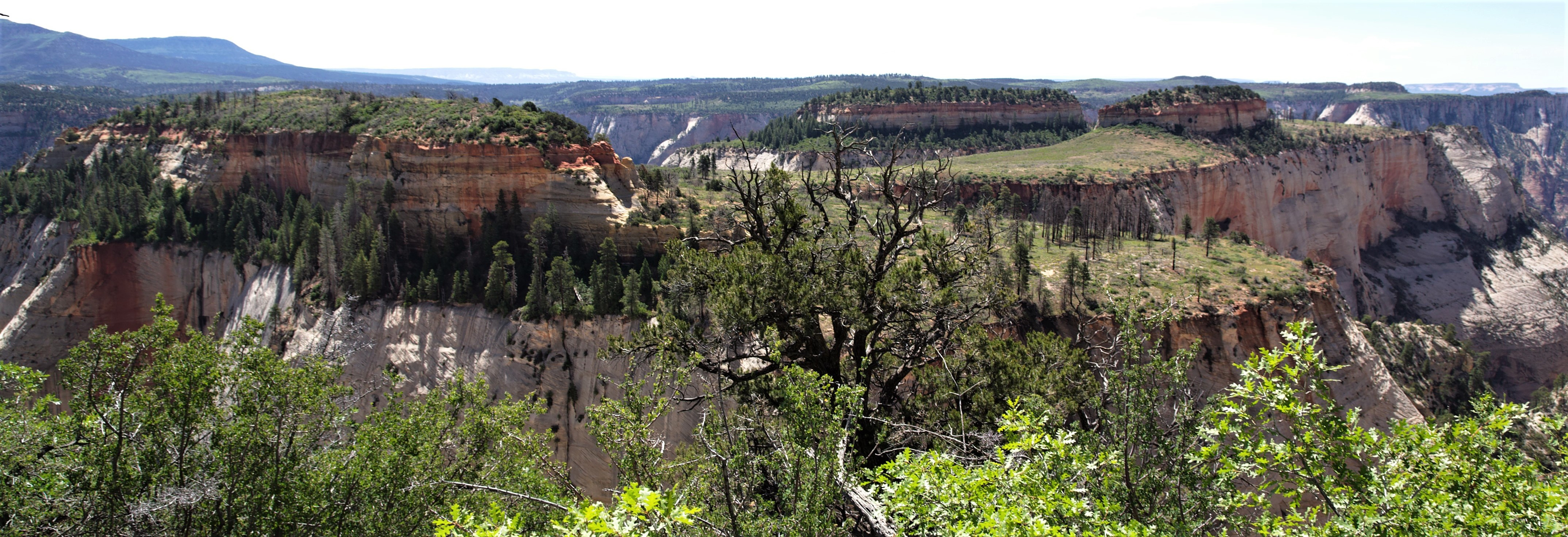
The top of Majestic, from West Rim Trail. 6,956' summit to right, 6,955' north summit left. Top of Cathedral in between.

== See also ==
- List of mountains in Utah
- Geology of the Zion and Kolob canyons area
- Colorado Plateau
