= Zion Lodge =

- Zion Lodge--Birch Creek Historic District (Boundary Increase)
- U.S. National Register of Historic Places
- U.S. Historic district
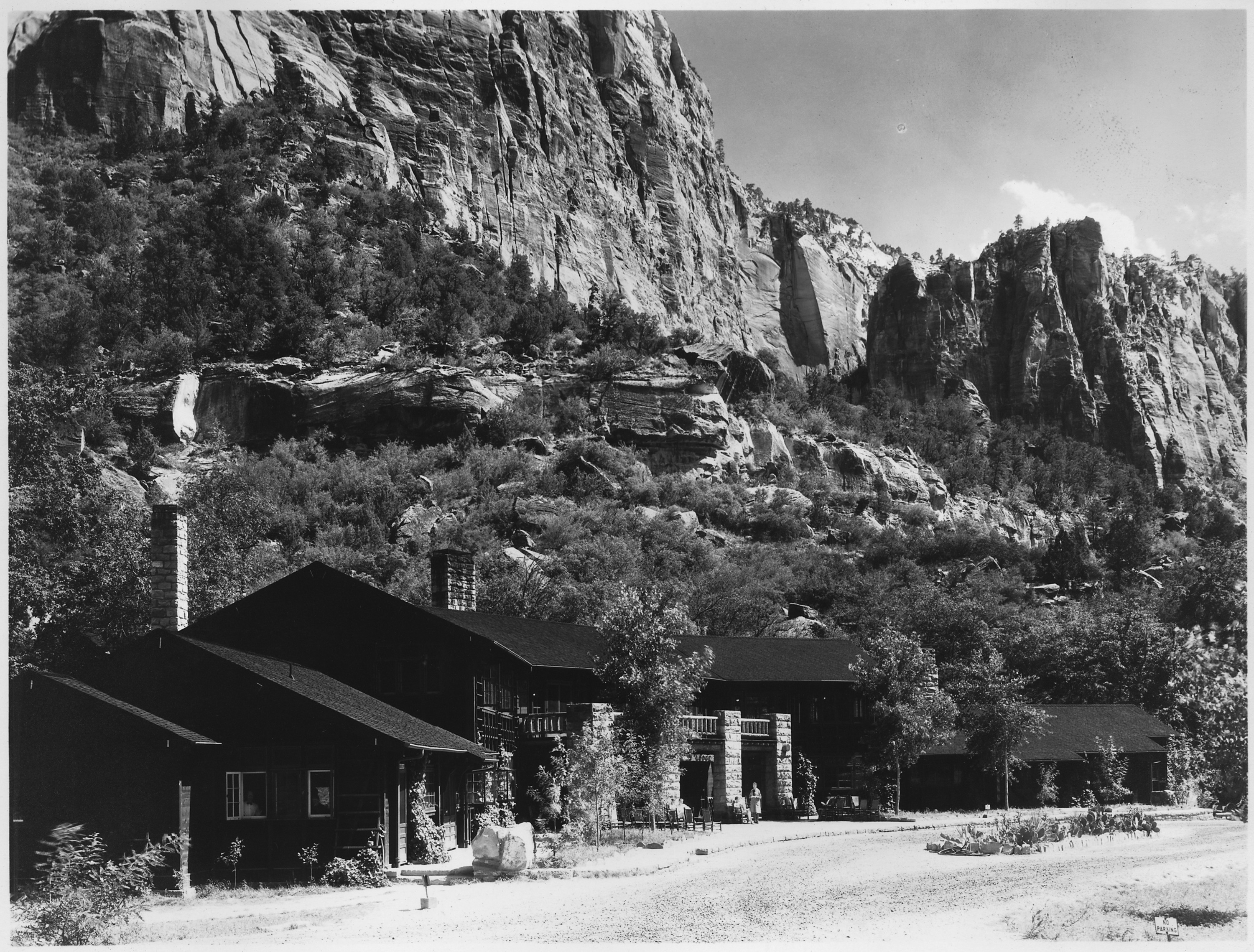
- Zion Lodge in 1929

- Location within Utah Location within the United States
- Nearest city: Springdale, Utah
- Coordinates: 37°15′5″N 112°57′21″W
- Area: 2 acres (0.81 ha)
- Architects: Underwood, Gilbert Stanley
- Architectural style: NPS Rustic style
- MPS: Zion National Park MRA
- NRHP reference No.: 86003753
- Added to NRHP: July 07, 1987

Zion Lodge is located in Zion National Park, Utah, United States. The lodge was designed in 1924 as a compromise solution between its developer, the Utah Parks Company, which wanted a large hotel, and National Park Service director Stephen Mather, who desired smaller-scale development. The Utah Parks Company had been formed in 1923 as a subsidiary of the Union Pacific Railroad, and was, like many similar programs, intended to stimulate passenger rail traffic to the national parks of southwest Utah.

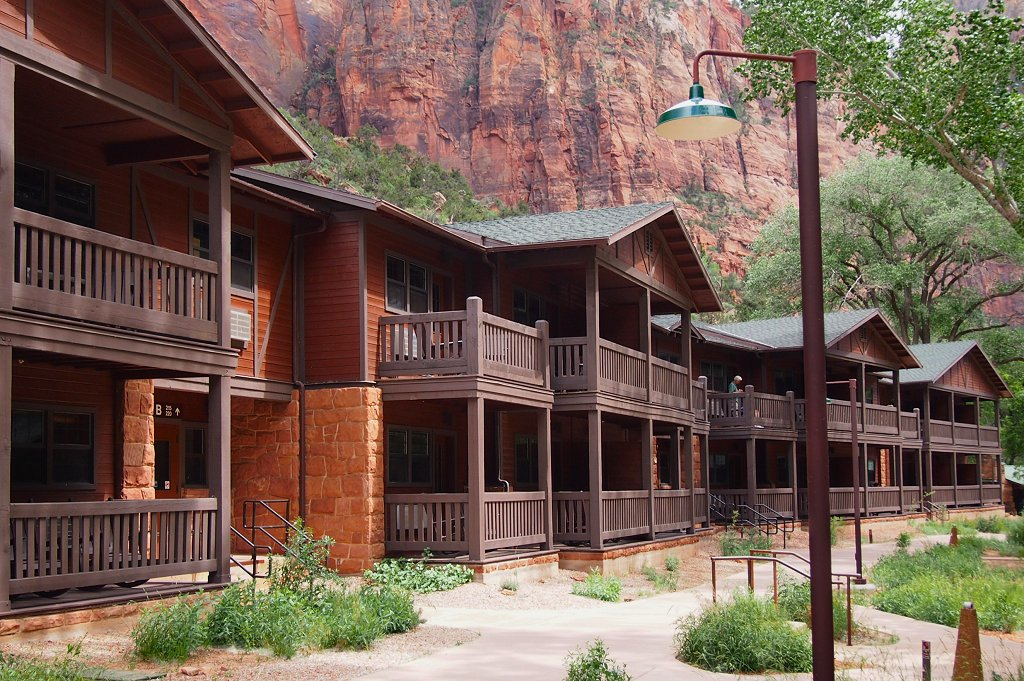
Newer hotel building at Zion Lodge

Gilbert Stanley Underwood designed the Zion Lodge as part of a series of similar structures for the Utah Parks Company at the north rim of the Grand Canyon and at Bryce Canyon National Park. Underwood's design was more modest in scale and detailing than those at the Grand Canyon and Bryce, substituting milled lumber for whole logs in a "studs-out" style. Underwood used less stonework, in smaller pieces. The structures were designed to be more in keeping with the character of the valley floor, which at the time of construction was still inhabited by settlers. Underwood would go on to design all of the Utah Parks Company buildings in the valley, many of which are included in the Zion Lodge Historic District, which surrounds the lodge.

A fire in 1966 destroyed the original main lodge building. It was rebuilt within 100 days, but the original rustic look was lost in favor of expedience in reopening the lodge. A 1990 remodel restored its original look.

In addition to the main lodge building there are a number of original buildings that remain in the lodge complex. This includes guest cabins built in 1927 and 1929, employee dormitories built in 1927 and 1937, and a few support buildings. All were designed by Underwood.

On April 12, 1995, a landslide blocked the Virgin River downstream from the lodge. Over a period of two hours, the river had carved away 590 feet (180 m) of the only exit road from the canyon, trapping 450 guests and employees in the lodge. A one-lane temporary road was constructed within 24 hours to allow evacuation. Access to the lodge was restored on May 25, 1995.

Zion Lodge is a member of Historic Hotels of America, the official program of the National Trust for Historic Preservation.

== See also ==
- List of Historic Hotels of America
