= The Pulpit =

The Pulpit may refer to:

- The Pulpit (Washington), a mountain in the Cascade Range, U.S.
- The Pulpit (Zion National Park), a sandstone pillar in Utah, U.S.
- The Pulpit (Greenland), a mountain in the Lemon Range

== See also ==
- Pulpit (disambiguation)
