= Pulpit (disambiguation) =

A pulpit is a raised stand for preachers in a Christian church.

Pulpit may also refer to:

- Pulpit (horse) (1994–2012), American Thoroughbred stallion, winner of Blue Grass Stakes
- The Pulpit (Washington), mountain in USA
- The Pulpit (Zion National Park), Utah

== See also ==
- Pulpit Lake, Custer County, Idaho, United States
- Pulpit Mountain, Coronation Island, South Orkney Islands
- Pulpit Peak, a mountain in Canada
- Pulpit Rock (disambiguation)
- Martin Pulpit (born 1967), Czech footballer and manager
- Lucky Pulpit (foaled 2001), American Thoroughbred stallion, son of Pulpit
- Pulpit Law, 1871 German anti-clerical law
- Pol Pot (1925–1998), Cambodian dictator
