= Russian Butte =

Mountain in Washington, United States of America

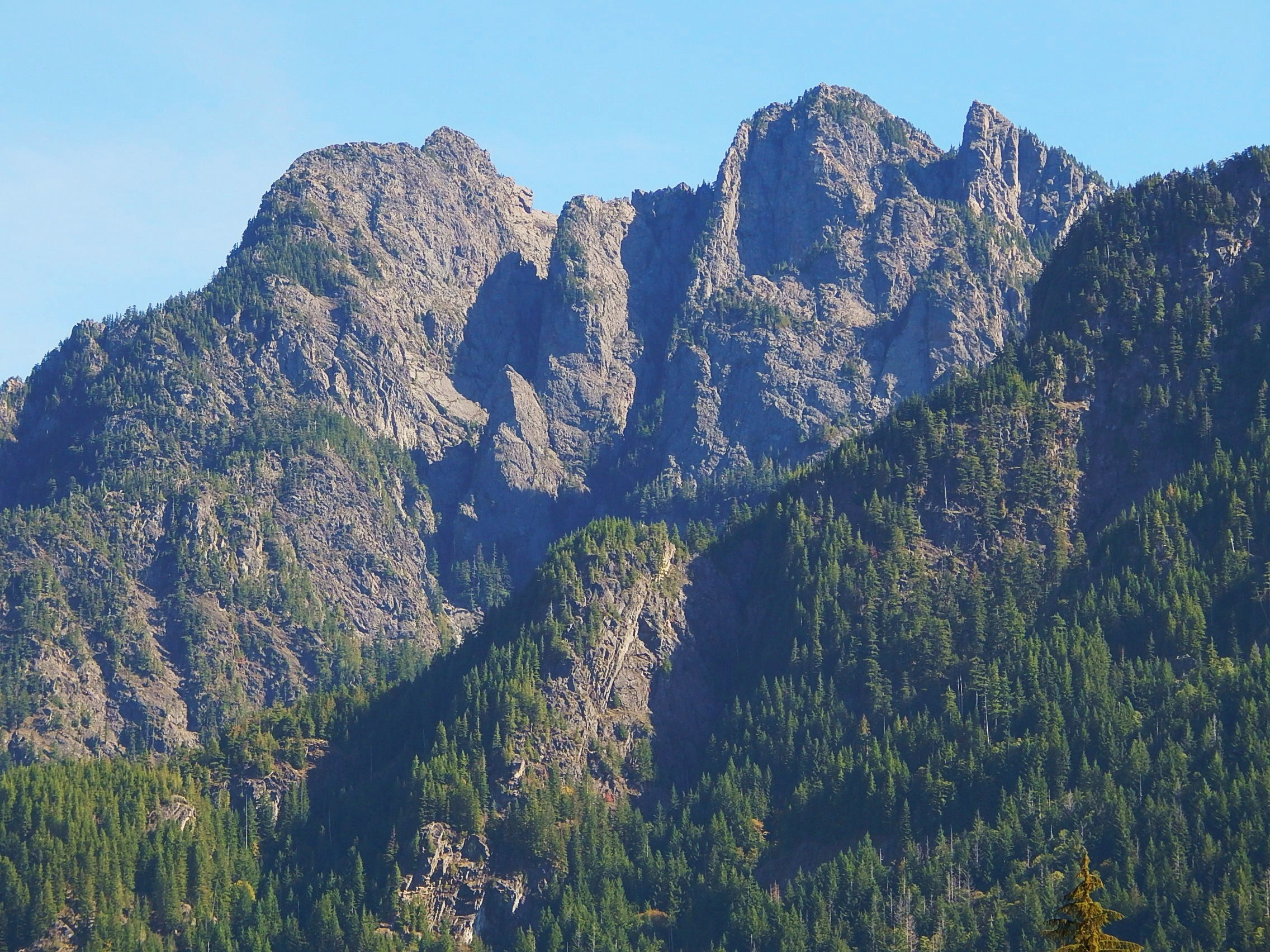
- Russian Butte

Highest point
- Elevation: 5,123 ft (1,561 m)
- Prominence: 523 ft (159 m)
- Coordinates: 47°29′44″N 121°35′22″W

Geography
- Location within Washington (state) Location within the United States
- Country: United States
- State: Washington
- County: King
- Parent range: Cascade Range
- Topo map: USGS Bandera

Climbing
- First ascent: 1960 by USGS Survey Party
- Easiest route: Scrambling

Russian Butte is a double-peak summit located in King County of Washington state. It is located at the western edge of the Cascade Range on land managed by Mount Baker-Snoqualmie National Forest. Precipitation runoff from Russian Butte drains into tributaries of the Snoqualmie River. Russian Butte is more notable for its large, steep rise above local terrain than for its absolute elevation. Topographic relief is significant as the summit rises nearly 4,300 feet (1,311 meters) above the Middle Fork Snoqualmie River in 1.5 mile (2.4 km). The nearest higher officially named peak is Preacher Mountain, 3.29 miles (5.29 km) to the east. Little Comrade is a small peak one-half mile to the south-southwest of Russian Butte.

== Climate ==
Russian Butte is located in the marine west coast climate zone of western North America.

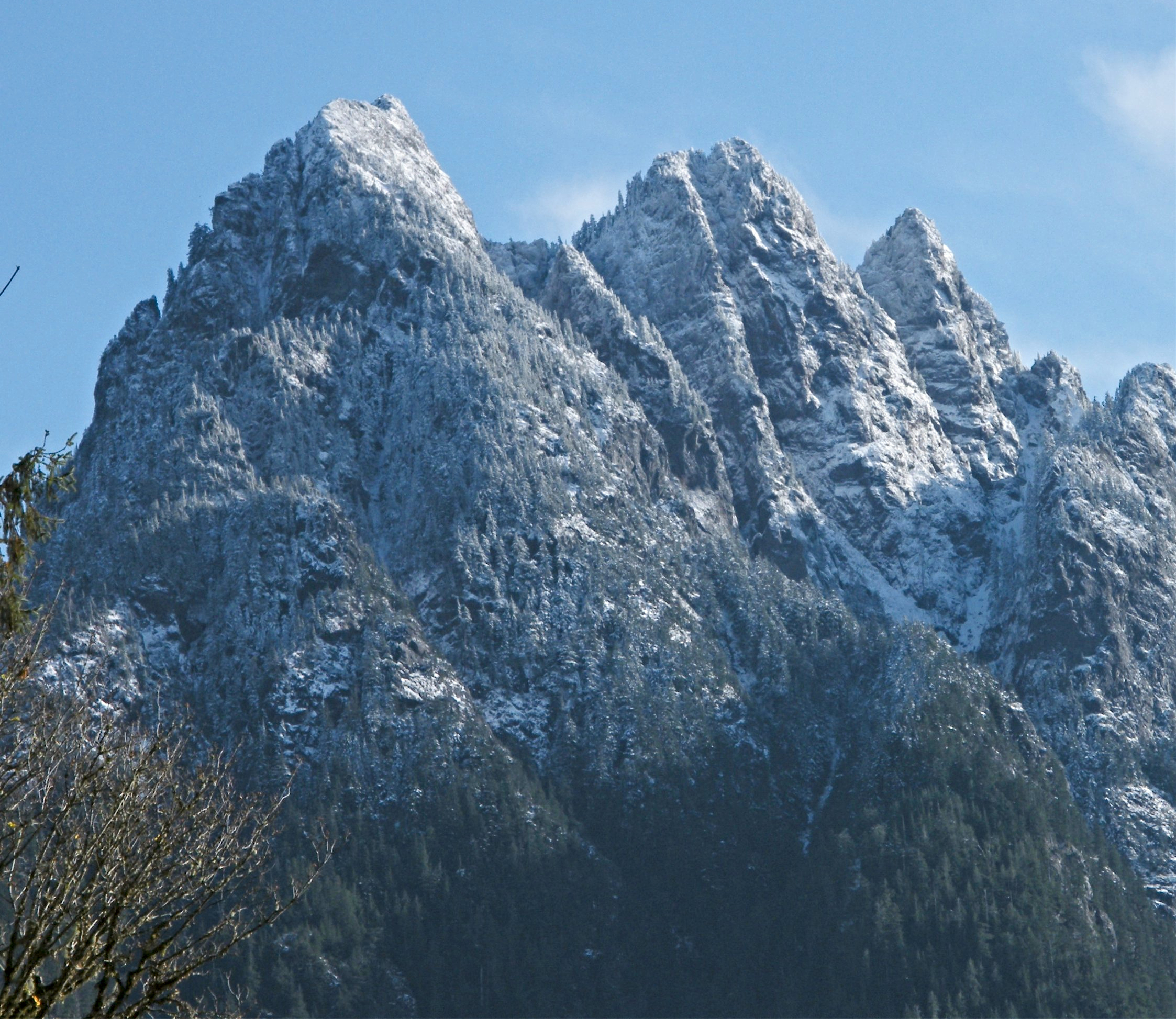
Russian Butte

Weather fronts originating in the Pacific Ocean travel northeast toward the Cascade Mountains. As fronts approach, they are forced upward by the peaks of the Cascade Range, causing them to drop their moisture in the form of rain or snow onto the Cascades (Orographic lift). As a result, the west side of the Cascades experiences high precipitation, especially during the winter months in the form of snowfall. Because of maritime influence, snow tends to be wet and heavy, resulting in high avalanche danger. During winter months, weather is usually cloudy, but, due to high pressure systems over the Pacific Ocean that intensify during summer months, there is often little or no cloud cover during the summer. The months July through September offer the most favorable weather for viewing or climbing this peak.

== Geology ==
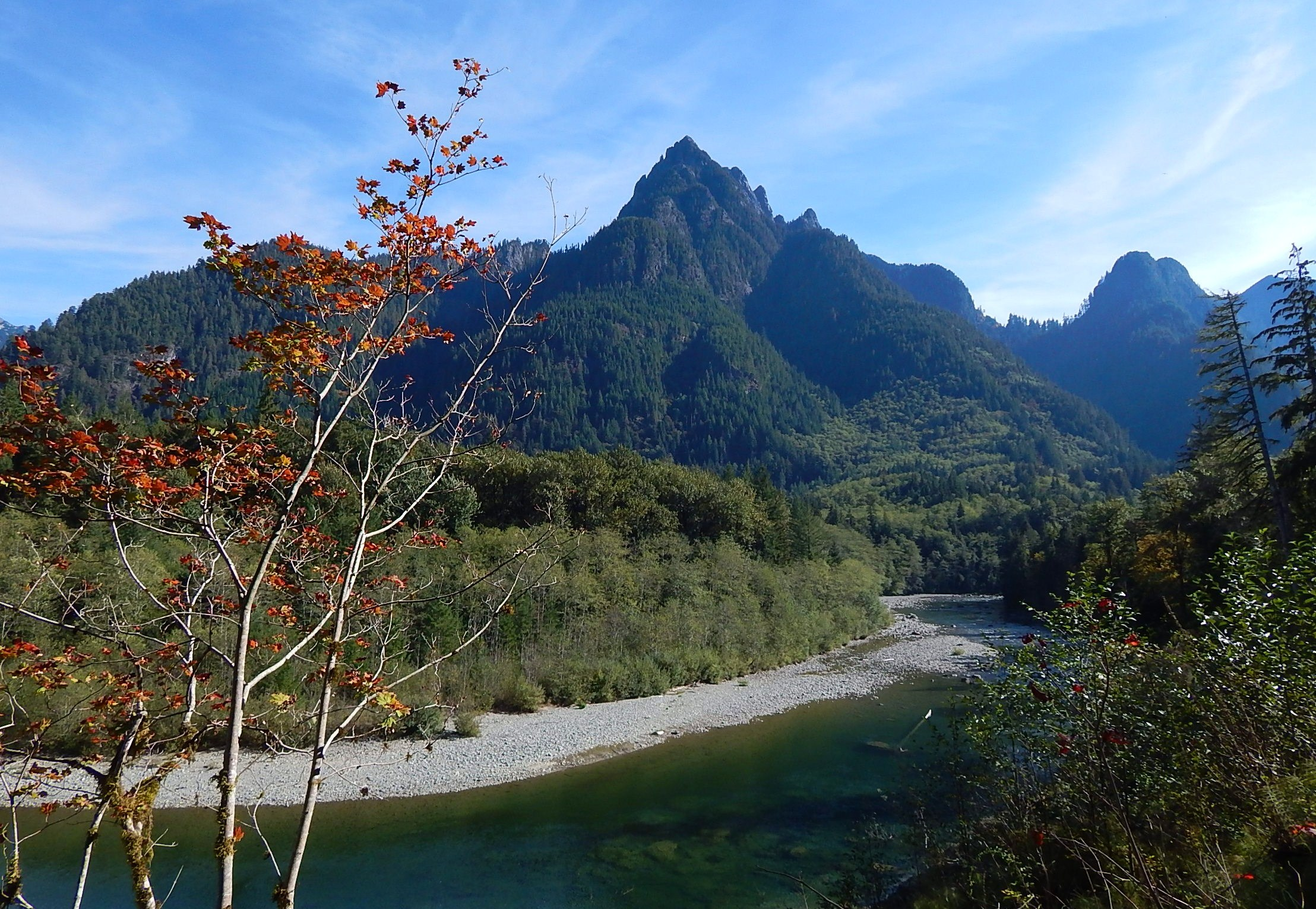
Russian Butte seen from Middle Fork Snoqualmie River Road

The history of the formation of the Cascade Mountains dates back millions of years ago to the late Eocene Epoch. During the Pleistocene period dating back over two million years ago, glaciation advancing and retreating repeatedly scoured the landscape leaving deposits of rock debris. The last glacial retreat in the area began about 14,000 years ago and was north of the Canada–US border by 10,000 years ago. The U-shaped cross section of the river valleys is a result of that recent glaciation. Uplift and faulting in combination with glaciation have been the dominant processes which have created the tall peaks and deep valleys of the Cascade Range.
