= Little Comrade (Washington) =

Summit in Washington state, USA

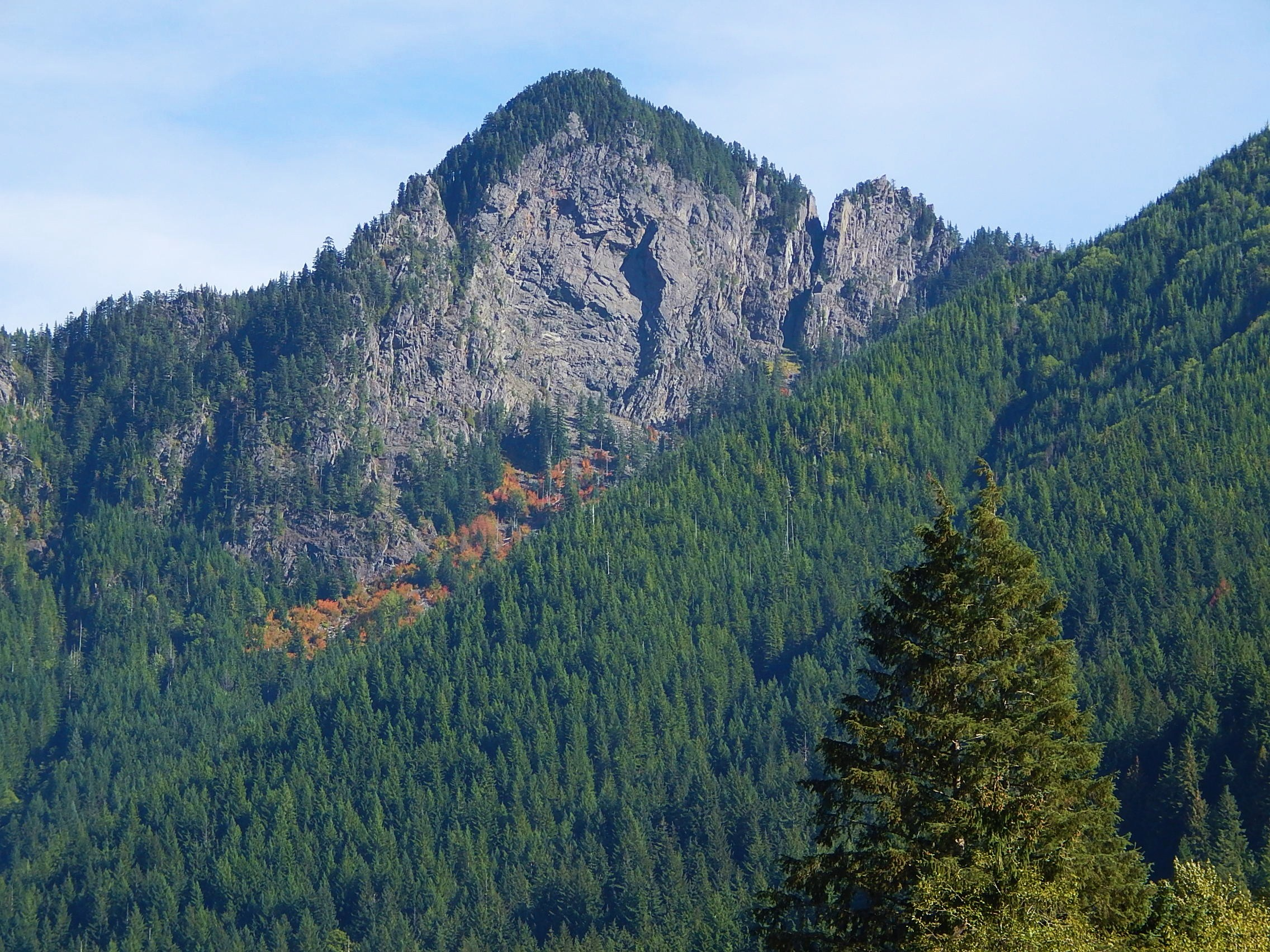
- Little Comrade

Highest point
- Elevation: 4,365 ft (1,330 m)
- Prominence: 285 ft (87 m)
- Coordinates: 47°29′09″N 121°36′16″W

Geography
- Location within Washington (state) Location within the United States
- Country: United States
- State: Washington
- County: King
- Protected area: Mount Baker-Snoqualmie National Forest
- Parent range: Cascade Range
- Topo map: USGS Bandera

Climbing
- Easiest route: Scrambling

Little Comrade is a small summit located in King County of Washington state. It is situated at the western edge of the Cascade Range on land managed by Mount Baker-Snoqualmie National Forest. Little Comrade is more notable for its large, steep rise above local terrain than for its absolute elevation. Precipitation runoff from Little Comrade drains into tributaries of the Snoqualmie River. Topographic relief is significant as the summit rises over 3,500 feet (1,100 meters) above Middle Fork Snoqualmie River in 1.3 mile (2.1 km). The nearest higher peak is Russian Butte, 0.49 miles (0.79 km) to the north-northeast.

== Climate ==
Little Comrade is located in the marine west coast climate zone of western North America. Most weather fronts originating in the Pacific Ocean travel northeast toward the Cascade Mountains. As fronts approach, they are forced upward by the peaks of the Cascade Range (orographic lift), causing them to drop their moisture in the form of rain or snowfall onto the Cascades. As a result, the west side of the Cascades experiences high precipitation, especially during the winter months in the form of snowfall. Because of maritime influence, snow tends to be wet and heavy, resulting in high avalanche danger. During winter months, weather is usually cloudy, but, due to high pressure systems over the Pacific Ocean that intensify during summer months, there is often little or no cloud cover during the summer.

== Geology ==
The history of the formation of the Cascade Mountains dates back millions of years ago to the late Eocene Epoch. During the Pleistocene period dating back over two million years ago, glaciation advancing and retreating repeatedly scoured the landscape leaving deposits of rock debris. The last glacial retreat in the area began about 14,000 years ago and was north of the Canada–US border by 10,000 years ago. The U-shaped cross section of the river valleys is a result of that recent glaciation. Uplift and faulting in combination with glaciation have been the dominant processes which have created the tall peaks and deep valleys of the Cascade Range.

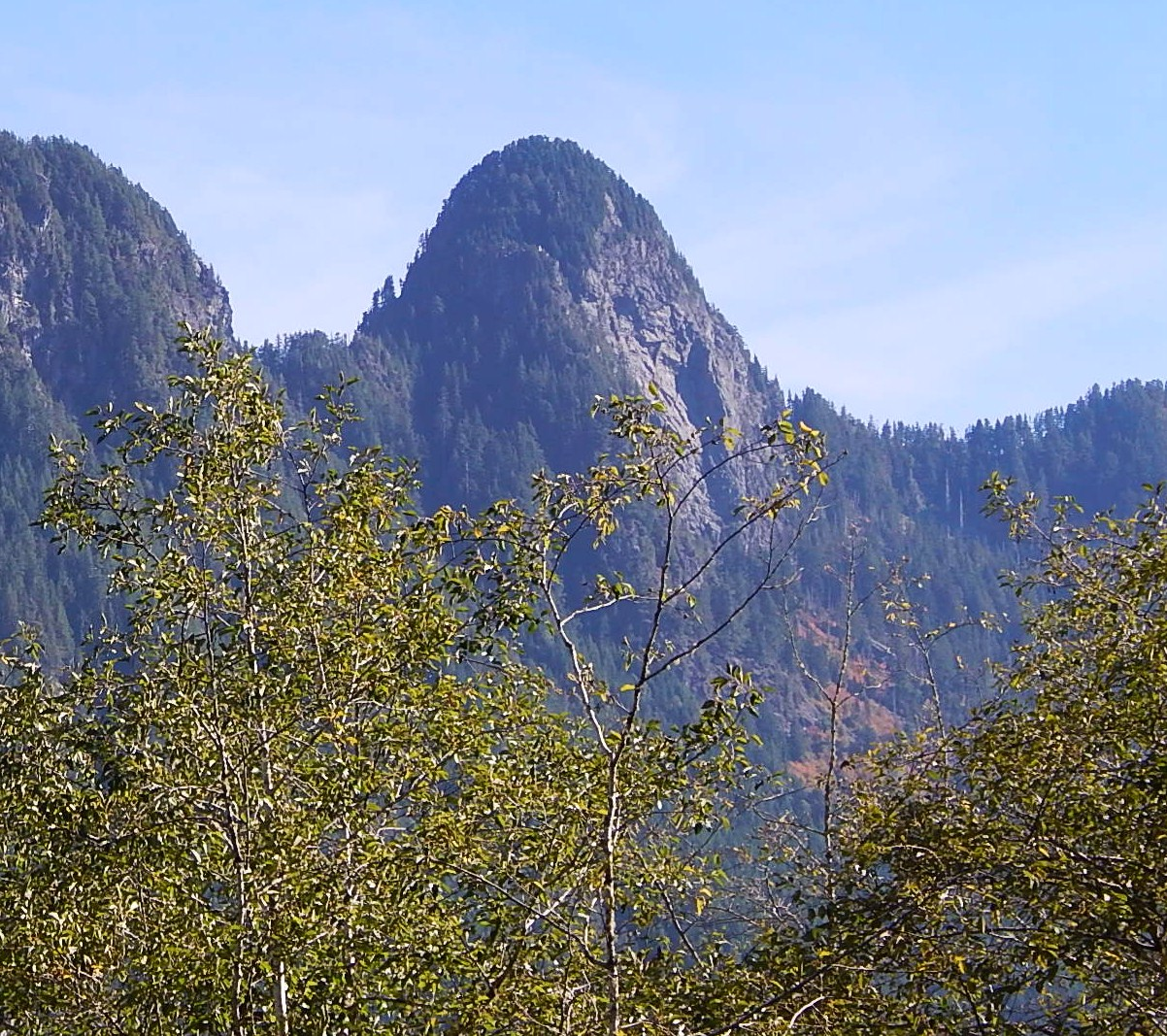
Little Comrade
