= Pulpit Rock =

Pulpit Rock may refer to:

- Preikestolen, a cliff in Norway
- Pulpit Rock (Isle of Portland), an extremity on the Isle of Portland, Dorset
- Pulpit Rock (The Dalles, Oregon), a rock in Oregon
- Pulpit Rock (Cape Schanck), Mornington Peninsula, Victoria, Australia
- Pulpit Rock, a significant rocky outcrop visible from Bundanon, New South Wales, Australia
- Pulpit Rock Tower, historic military observation tower on the Atlantic coast in New Hampshire
- Pulpit Rocks, National Historic Landmark near Huntingdon, Pennsylvania

== See also ==
- Pulpit (disambiguation)
