= Mountain of Mystery (Zion National Park) =

Mountain in the state of Utah

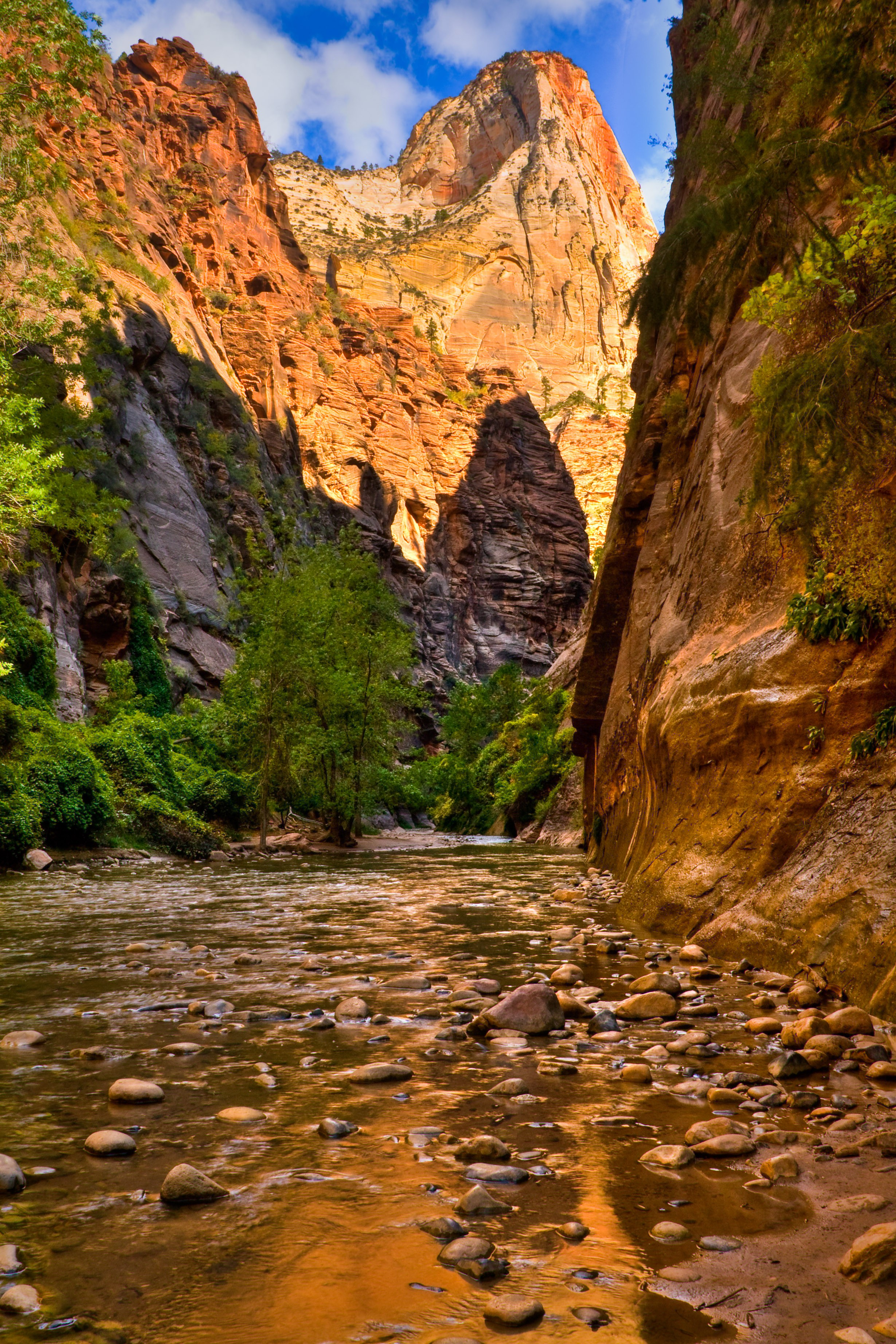
- Southwest aspect, from The Narrows

Highest point
- Elevation: 6,565 ft (2,001 m)
- Prominence: 805 ft (245 m)
- Parent peak: Flagpole Mountain
- Isolation: 0.45 mi (0.72 km)
- Coordinates: 37°18′10″N 112°56′21″W

Geography
- Location within Utah Location within the United States
- Country: United States
- State: Utah
- County: Washington
- Protected area: Zion National Park
- Parent range: Colorado Plateau
- Topo map: USGS Temple of Sinawava

Geology
- Rock age: Jurassic
- Rock type: Navajo sandstone

Climbing
- Easiest route: class 5.2 Northeast Buttress

Mountain of Mystery is a 6,565-foot (2,001 m) Navajo Sandstone summit located in Zion National Park, in Washington County of southwest Utah, United States. Mountain of Mystery is situated above The Narrows, towering over 2,100 feet (640 meters) above the floor of Zion Canyon and the North Fork Virgin River which drains precipitation runoff from this mountain. This peak rises above Orderville Canyon on its north side, and Mystery Canyon on the south. Its neighbors include Mount Majestic, Cathedral Mountain, Observation Point, Cable Mountain, Angels Landing, and The Organ. This feature's name was officially adopted in 1934 by the U.S. Board on Geographic Names. The first ascent via the Northeast Buttress was made 15 September 2001, by Brian Cabe and Tom Jones.

== Climate ==
Spring and fall are the most favorable seasons to visit Mountain of Mystery. According to the Köppen climate classification system, it is located in a Cold semi-arid climate zone, which is defined by the coldest month having an average mean temperature below 32 °F (0 °C), and at least 50% of the total annual precipitation being received during the spring and summer. This desert climate receives less than 10 inches (250 millimeters) of annual rainfall, and snowfall is generally light during the winter.

== See also ==
- List of mountains in Utah
- Geology of the Zion and Kolob canyons area
- Colorado Plateau

== Gallery ==
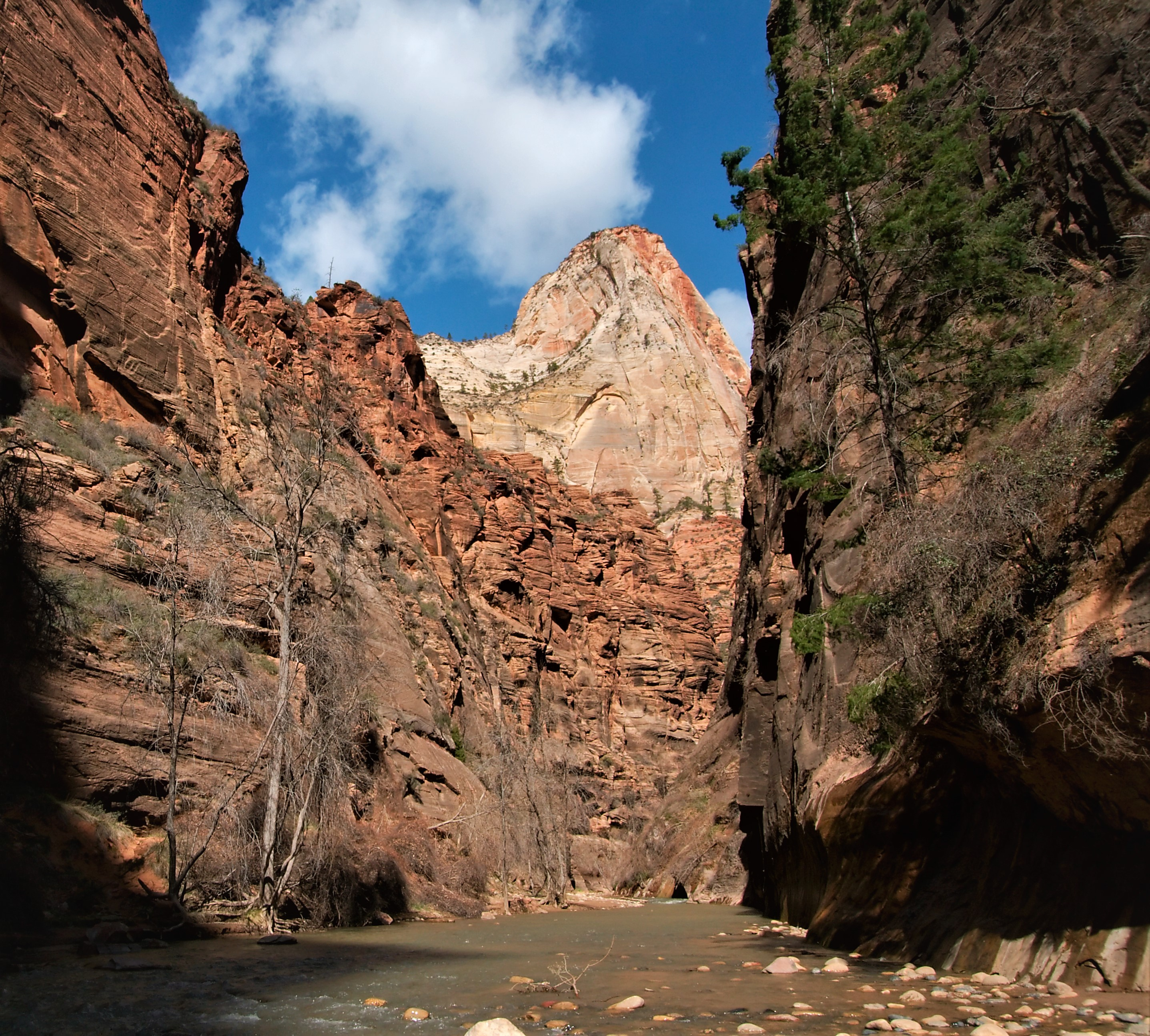

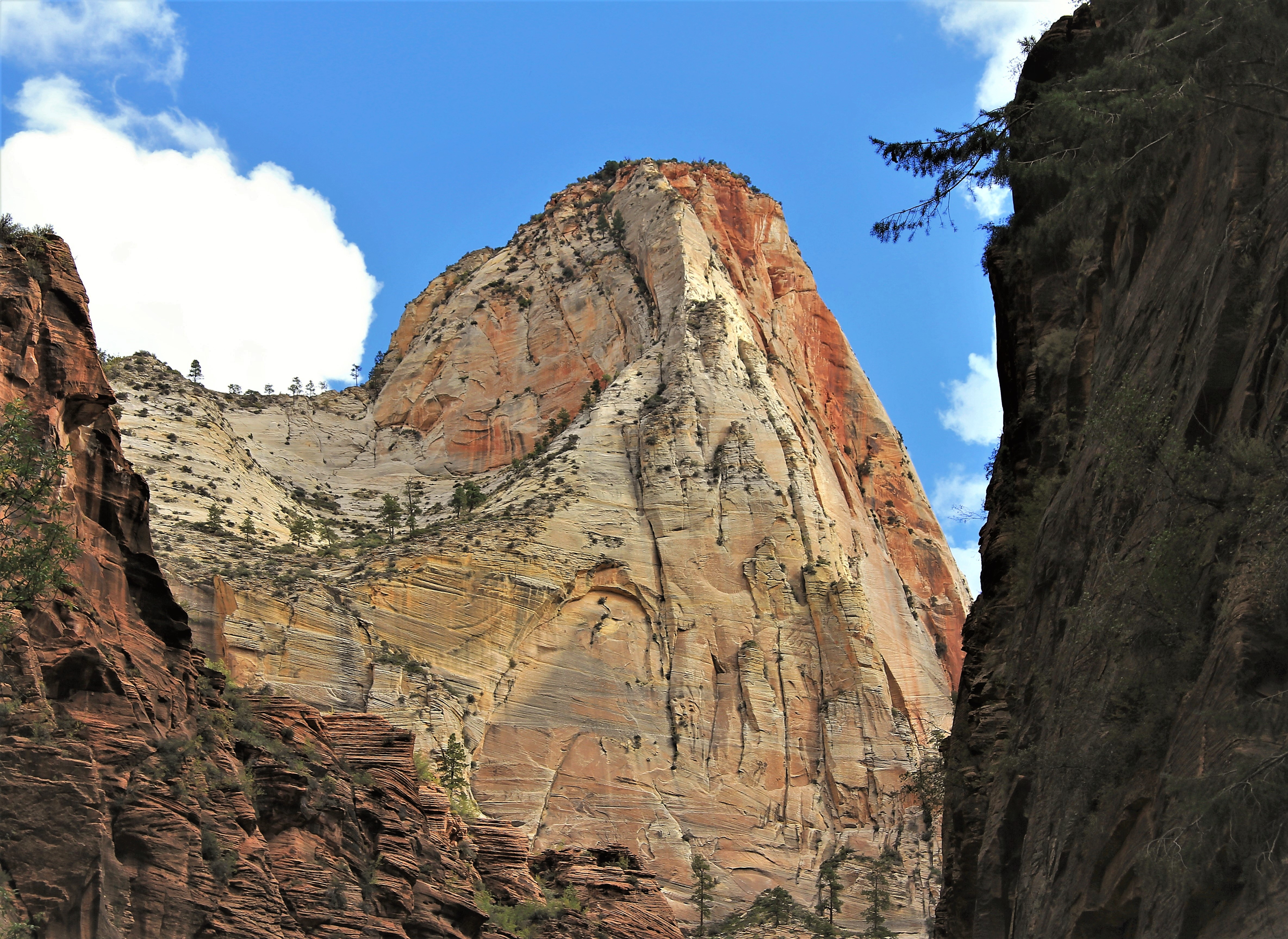
Southwest aspect

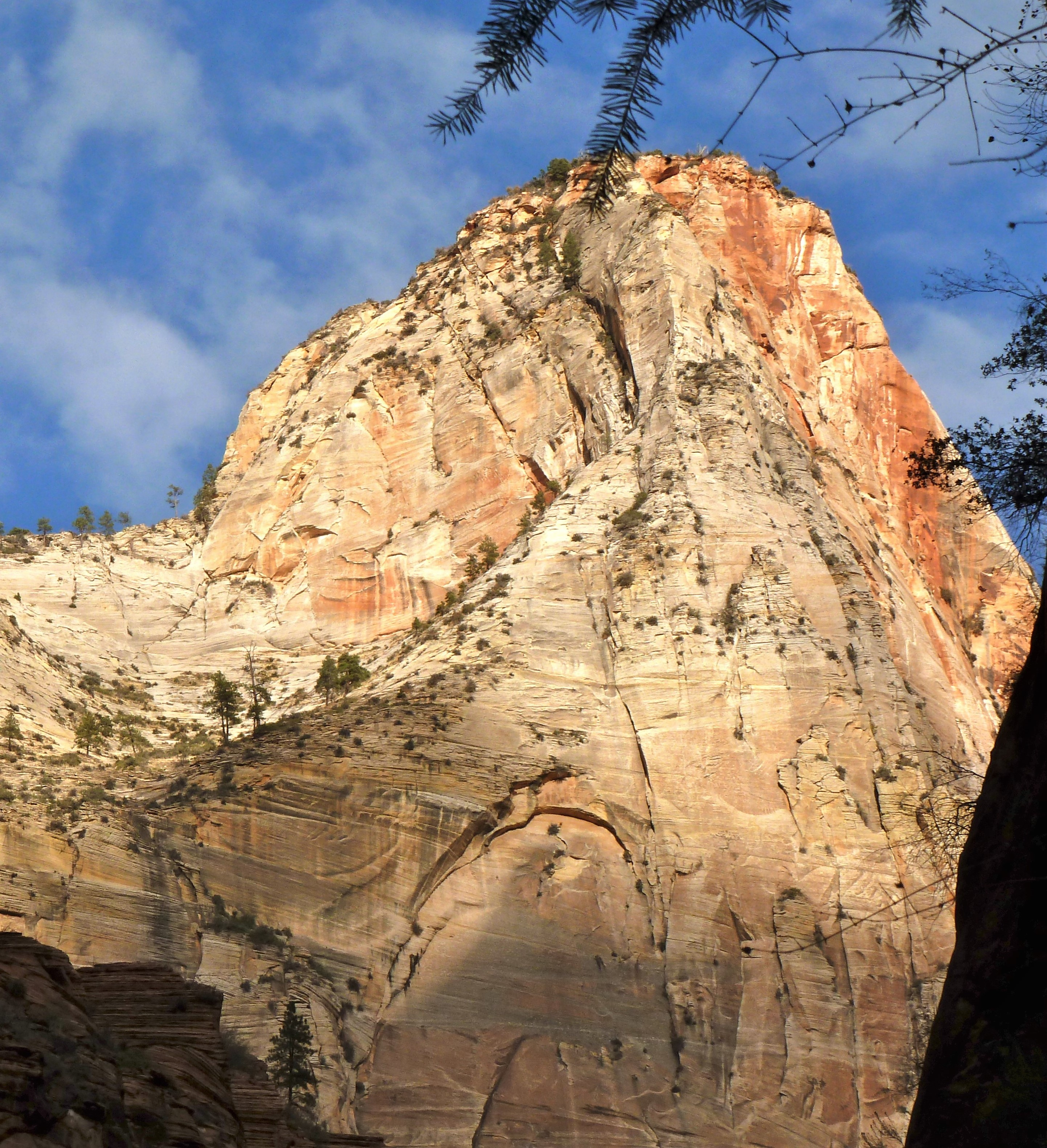
Southwest aspect

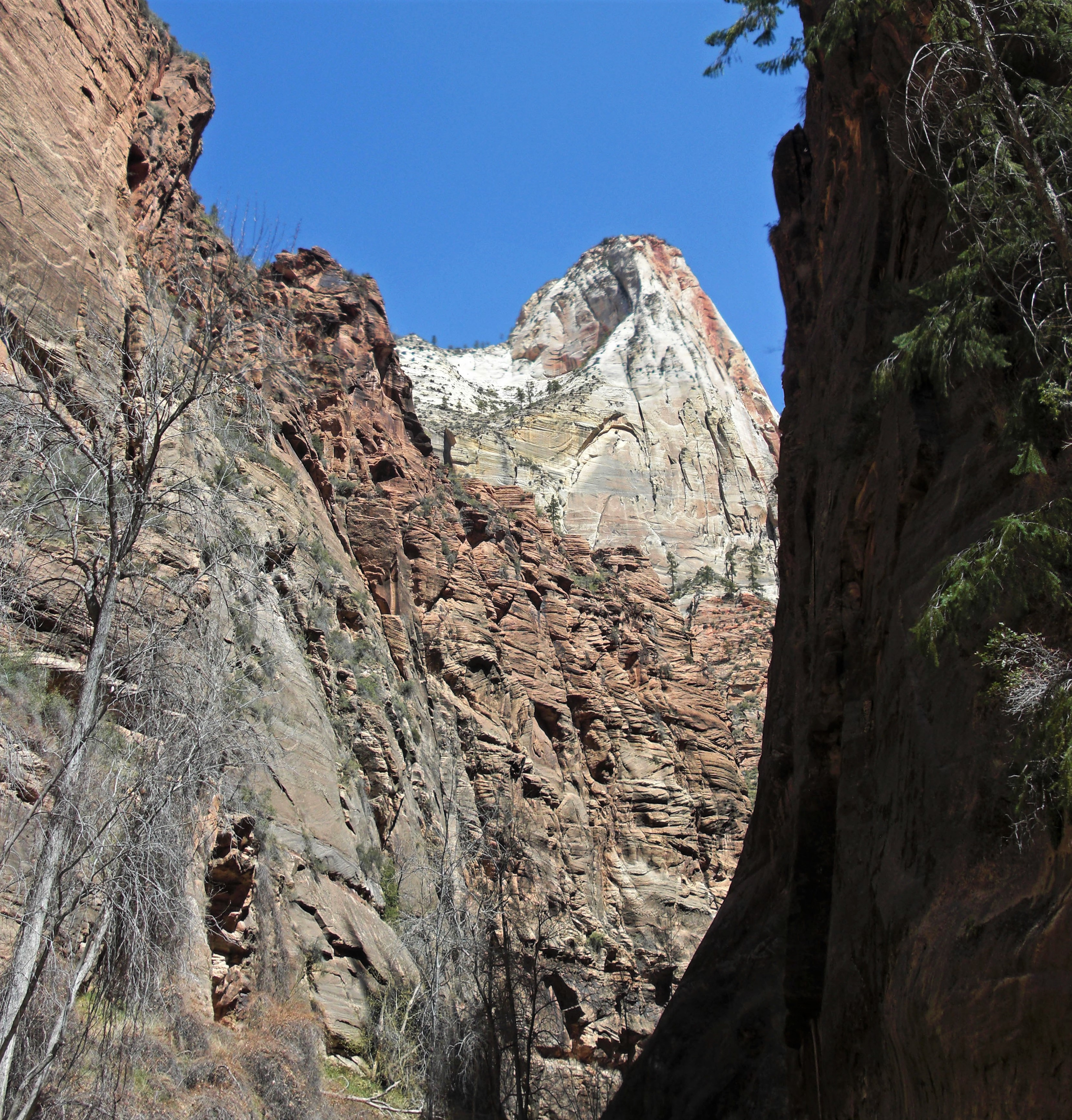
From The Narrows

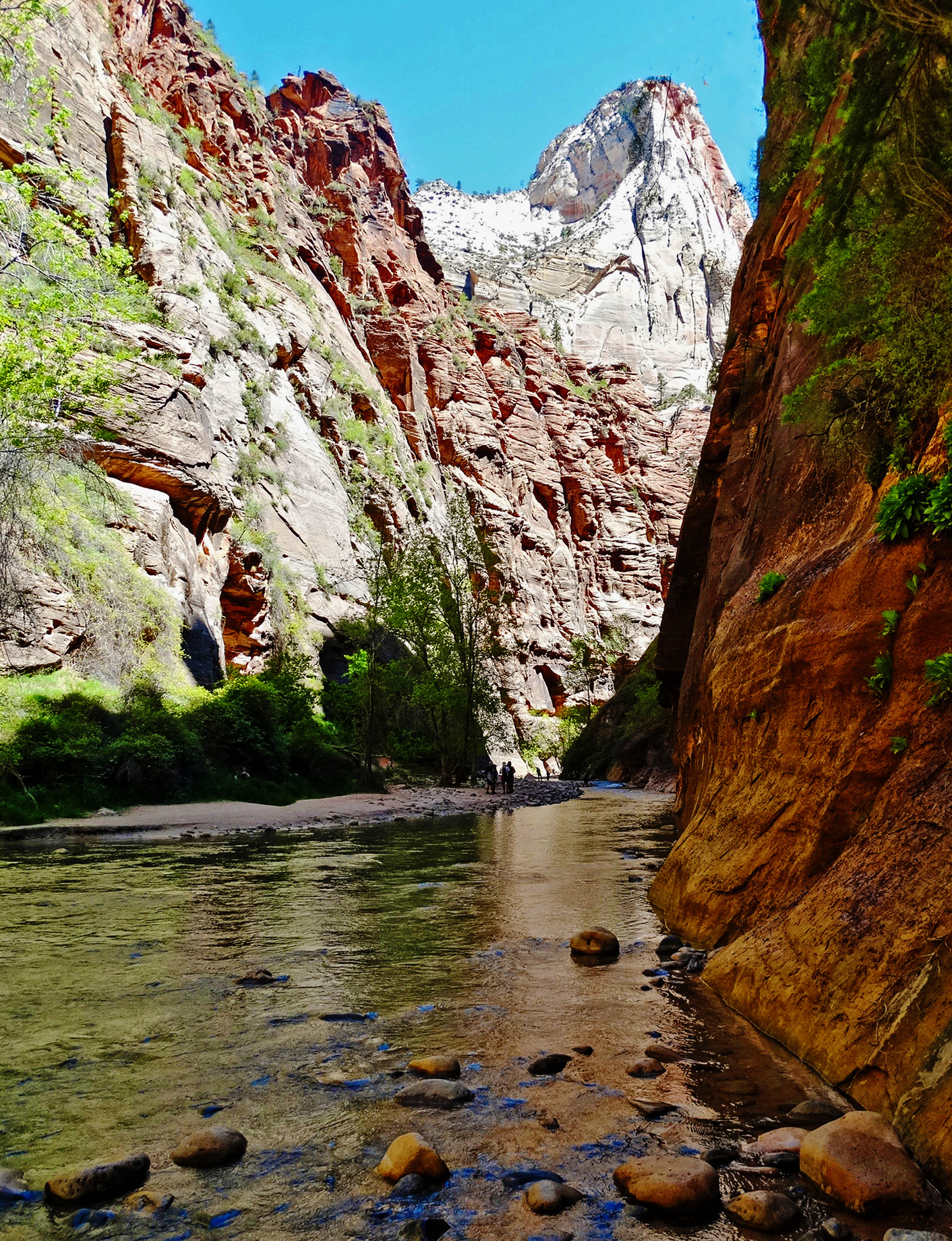
Southwest aspect

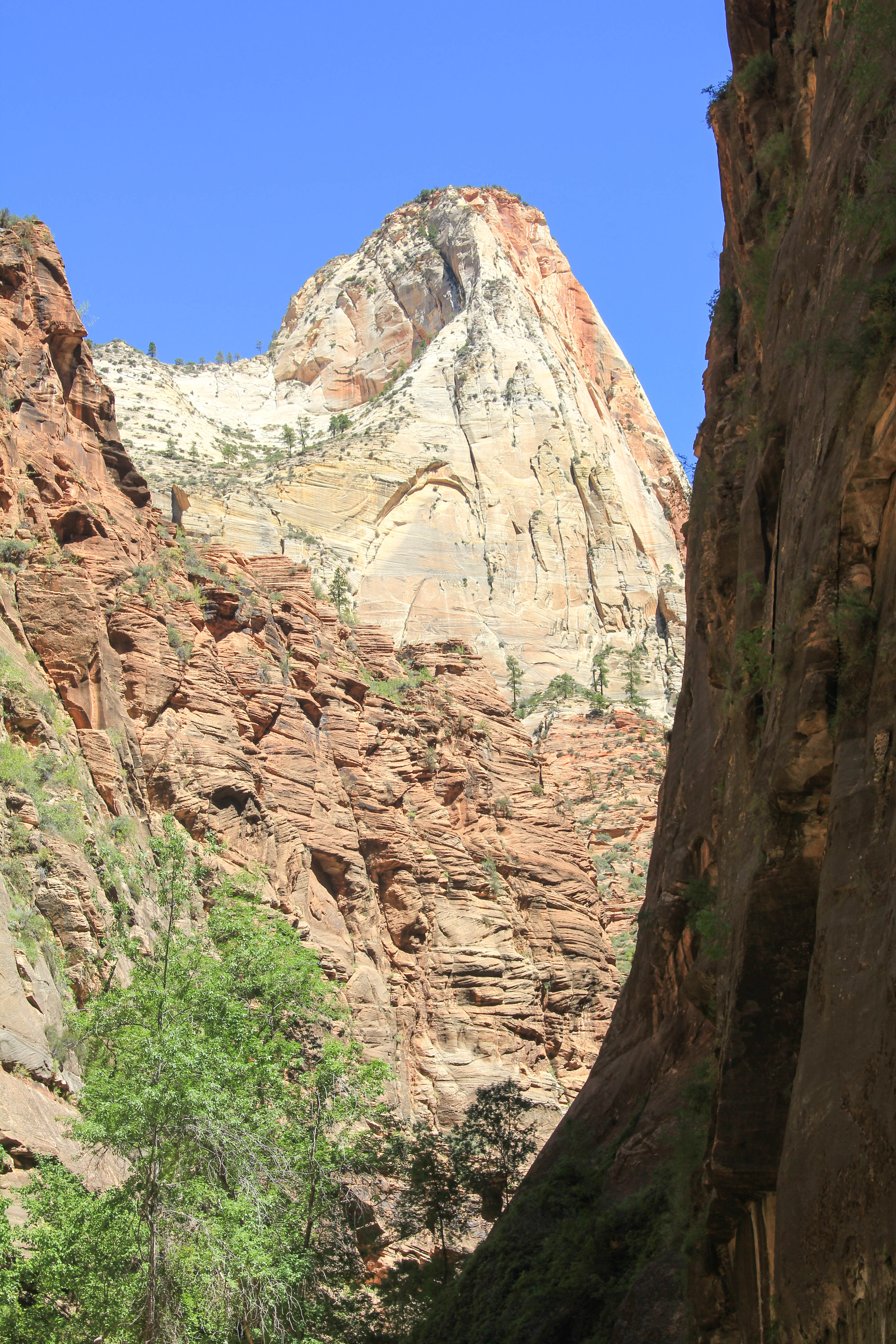
