= Pulpit Mountain =

Mountain in the South Orkney Islands

Coordinates: 60°41′S 45°13′W

Pulpit Mountain is a conspicuous, red-colored mountain, 945 m, standing 1.5 nautical miles (2.8 km) west of Spence Harbor at the east end of Coronation Island, in the South Orkney Islands. Named by the Falkland Islands Dependencies Survey (FIDS) following their survey of 1948–49. The feature resembles a pulpit when seen from the east.
