= The Pulpit (Zion National Park) =

Navajo Sandstone pillar in Utah, United States

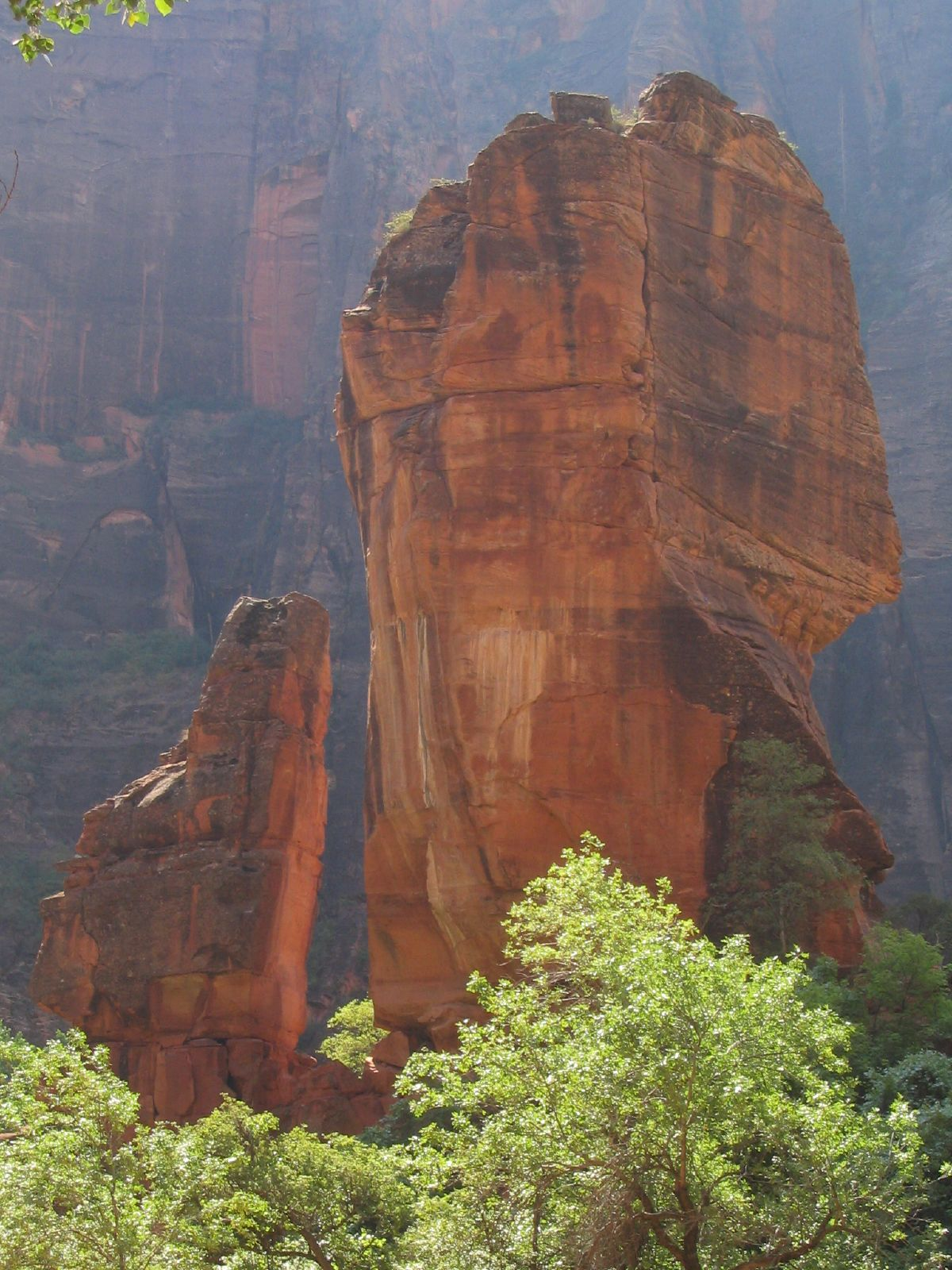
- The Pulpit seen from the north

Highest point
- Elevation: 4,600 ft (1,400 m)
- Prominence: 160 ft (49 m)
- Parent peak: Mount Majestic (6,956 ft)
- Isolation: 0.87 mi (1.40 km)
- Coordinates: 37°17′02″N 112°56′51″W

Geography
- Location within Utah Location within the United States
- Country: United States
- State: Utah
- County: Washington
- Protected area: Zion National Park
- Parent range: Colorado Plateau
- Topo map: USGS Temple of Sinawava

Geology
- Rock age: Jurassic
- Rock type: Navajo sandstone

Climbing
- First ascent: 1967
- Easiest route: class 5.9 climbing

The Pulpit is a 4,600-foot (1,400 m) elevation Navajo Sandstone pillar located in Zion National Park, in Washington County of southwest Utah, United States.

== Description ==
The Pulpit is situated in the Temple of Sinawava at the north end of Zion Canyon, rising 160 feet (49 meters) above the canyon floor and the North Fork of the Virgin River which drains precipitation runoff from this rock. It is a photographic icon seen from the parking area at the end of Zion Canyon Scenic Drive, and the entrance to The Narrows. Neighbors include Mountain of Mystery to the north, Observation Point to the southeast, Angels Landing and The Organ to the south, and Cathedral Mountain to the southwest. The first ascent was made April 15, 1967, by Fred Beckey, Eric Bjornstad, Hal Woodworth, Pat Callis, and Galen Rowell.

== Climate ==
Spring and fall are the most favorable seasons to view or climb The Pulpit. According to the Köppen climate classification system, it is located in a Cold semi-arid climate zone, which is defined by the coldest month having an average mean temperature below 32 °F (0 °C), and at least 50% of the total annual precipitation being received during the spring and summer. This desert climate receives less than 10 inches (250 millimeters) of annual rainfall, and snowfall is generally light during the winter.

== Gallery ==
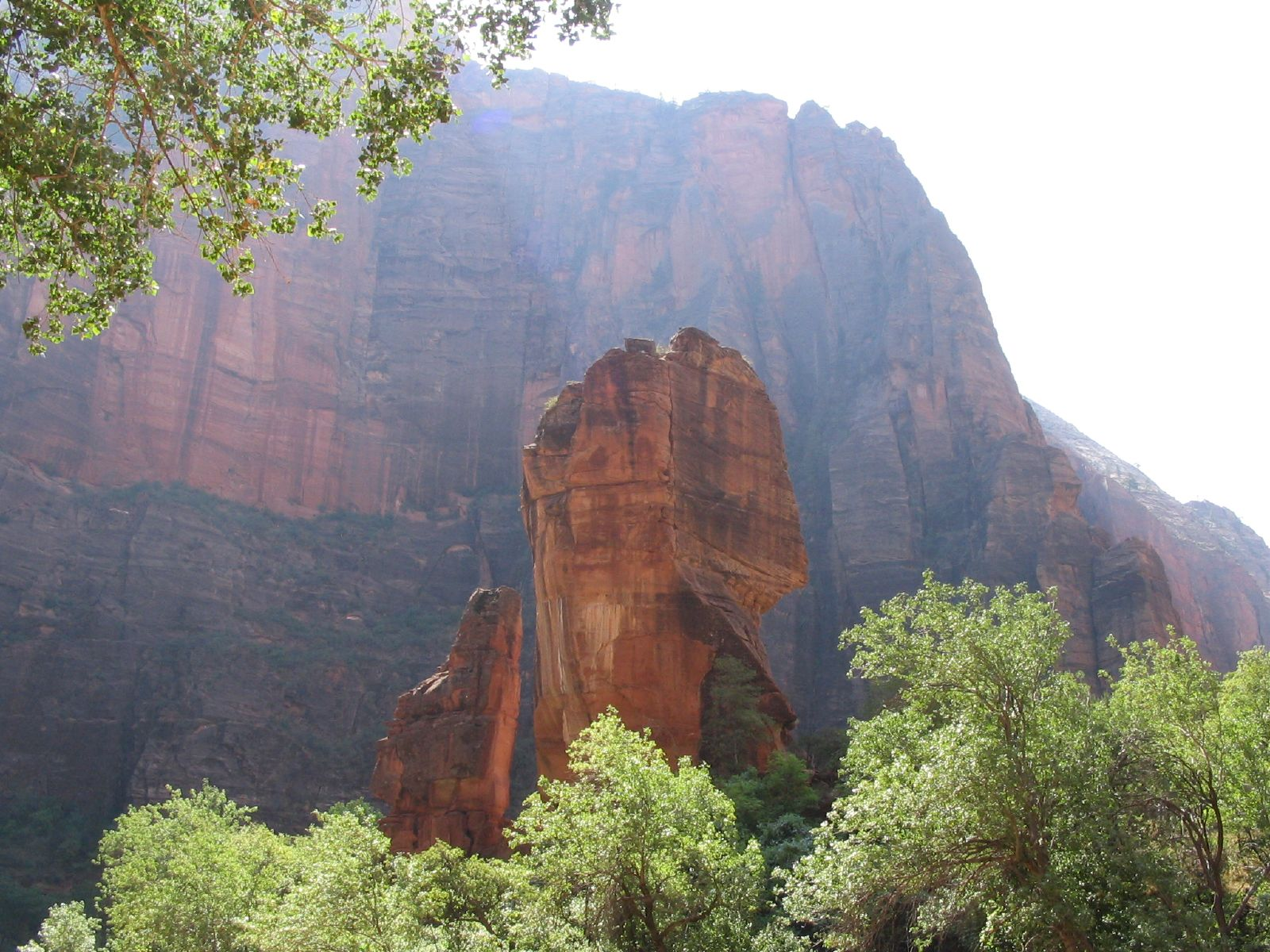

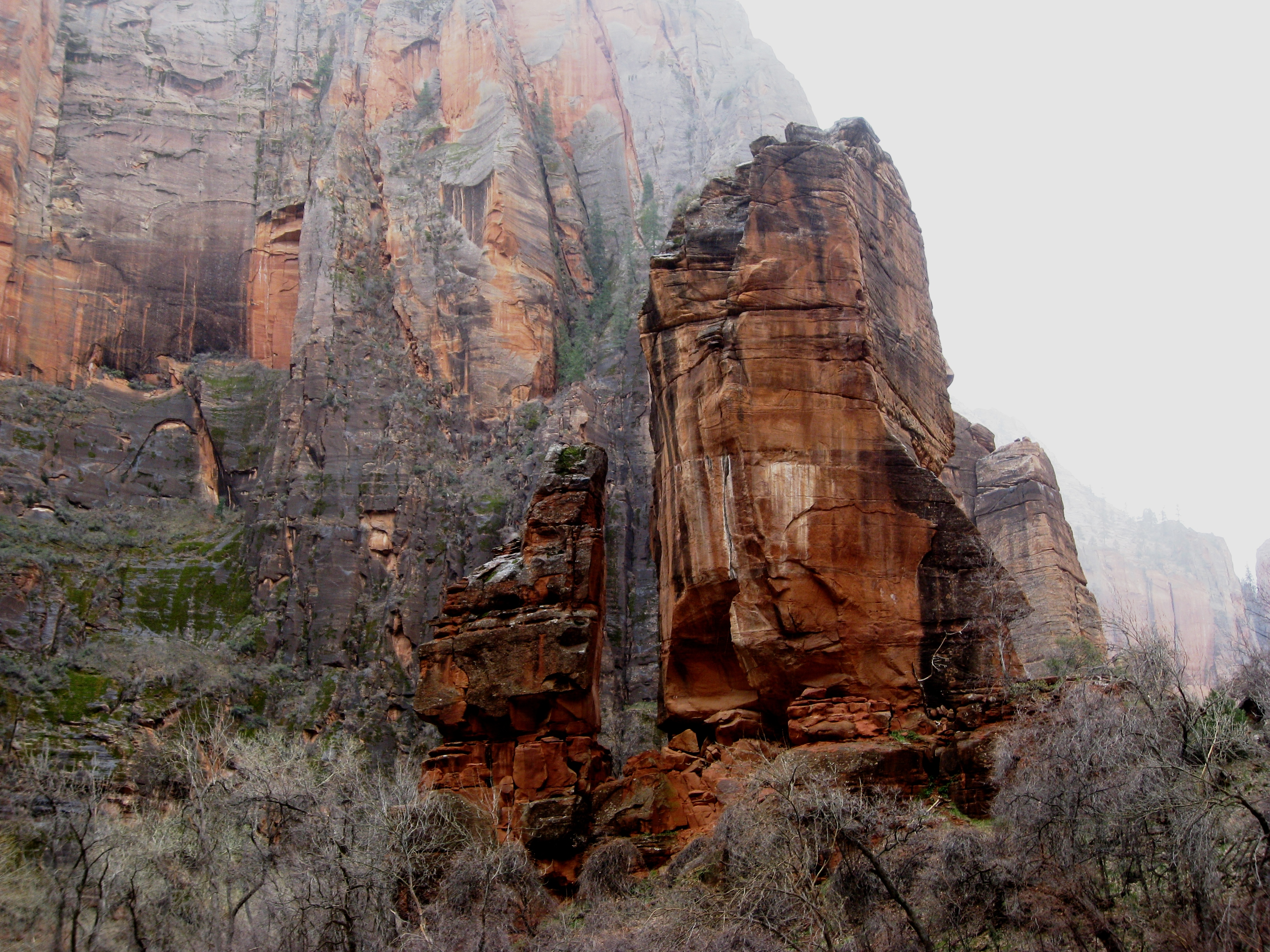

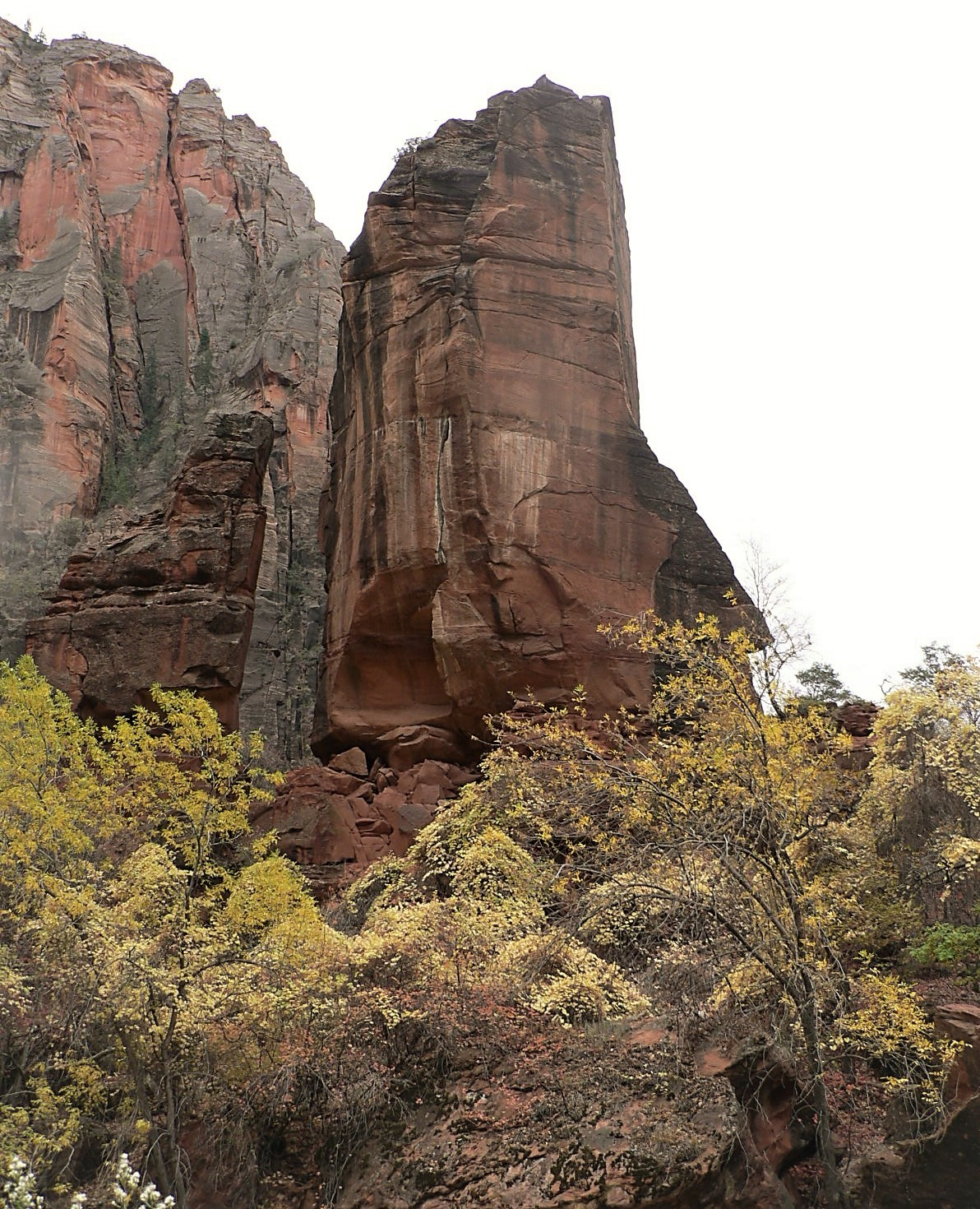

== See also ==
- Geology of the Zion and Kolob canyons area
- Colorado Plateau
