= Court of the Patriarchs =

Sandstone cliff in the state of Utah

Coordinates: 37.2372044°N 112.9649401°W

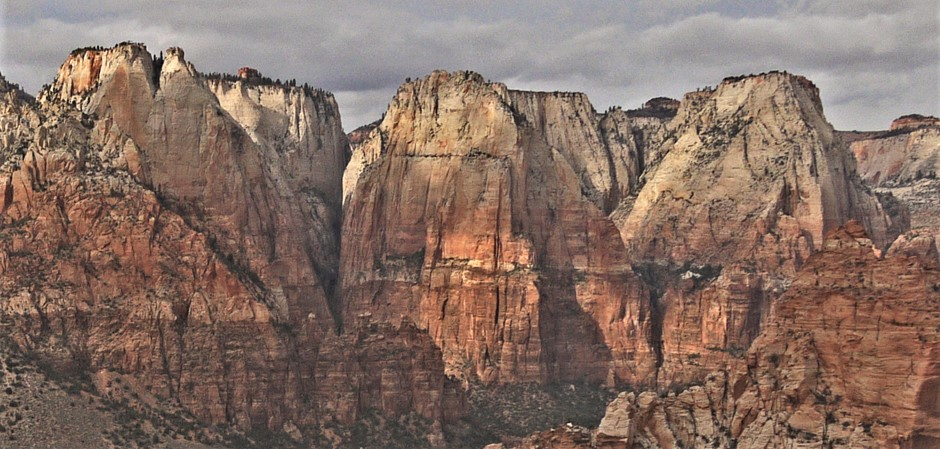
View of the Court of the Patriarchs cliff (below the Three Patriarchs) from Bridge Mountain, November 2013

The Court of the Patriarchs is a sandstone cliff on the south face of the Three Patriarchs in Zion Canyon in Zion National Park in Washington County, Utah, United States.

== Climate ==
Spring and fall are the most favorable seasons to visit the Court of the Patriarchs. According to the Köppen climate classification system, it is located in a cold semi-arid climate zone, which is defined by the coldest month having an average mean temperature below 32 °F (0 °C), and at least 50% of the total annual precipitation being received during the spring and summer. This desert climate receives less than 10 inches (250 millimeters) of annual rainfall, and snowfall is generally light during the winter.

== Gallery ==
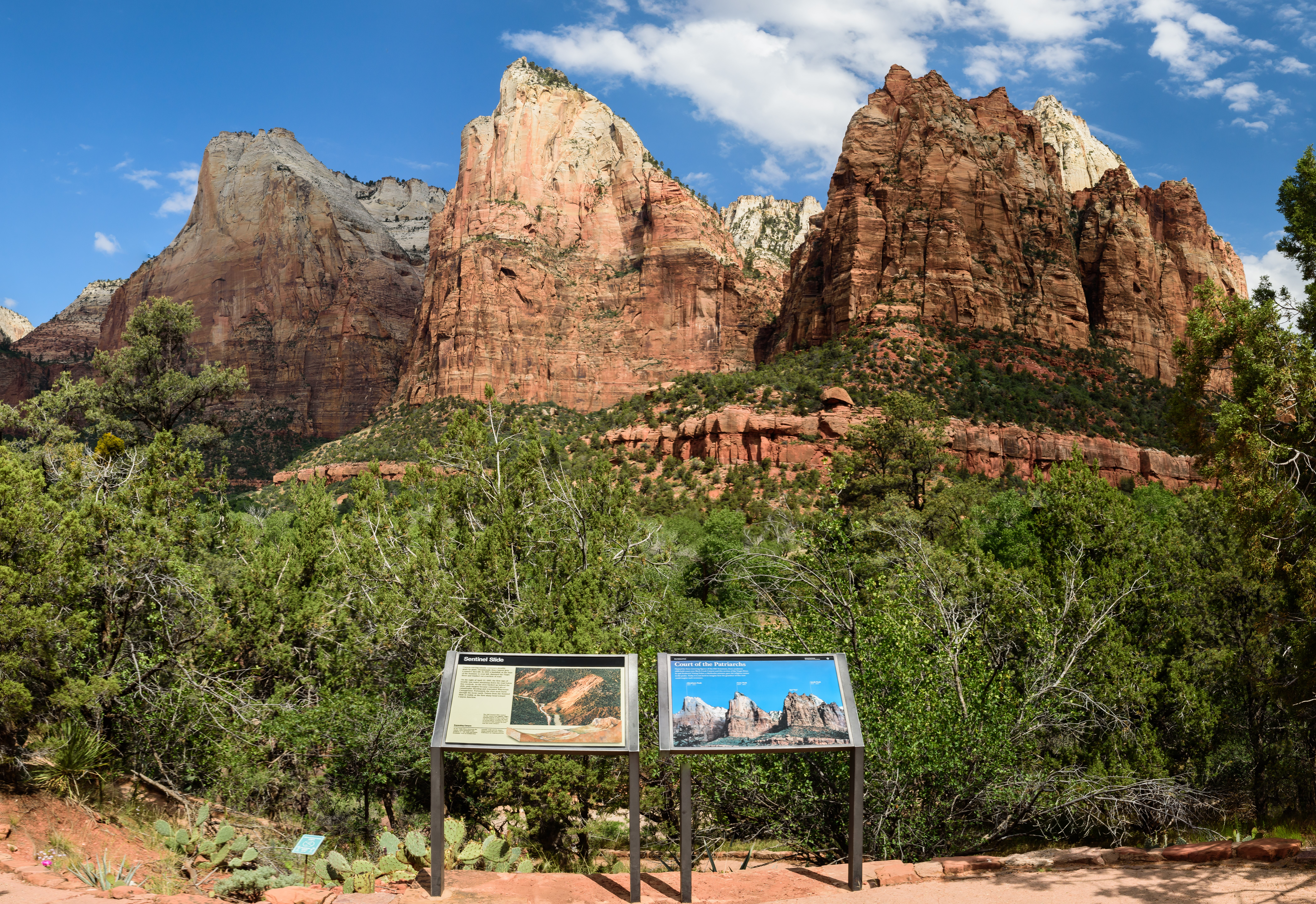
Three Patriarchs: Abraham Peak, Isaac Peak, Jacob Peak, and Mount Moroni, May 2015

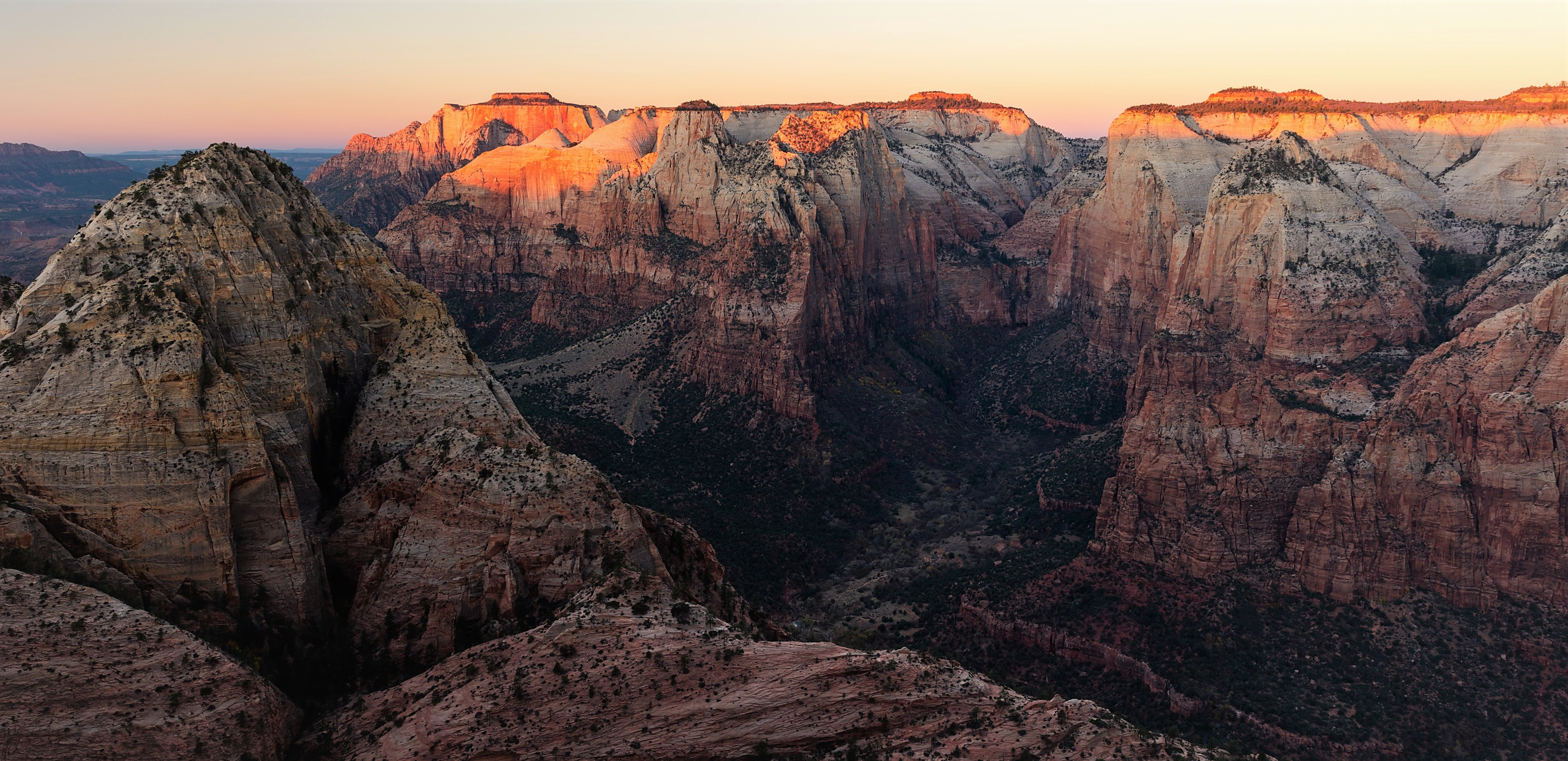
Sunrise from Deertrap Mountain. Court of the Patriarchs centered down below. Mountain of the Sun foreground left, November 2016

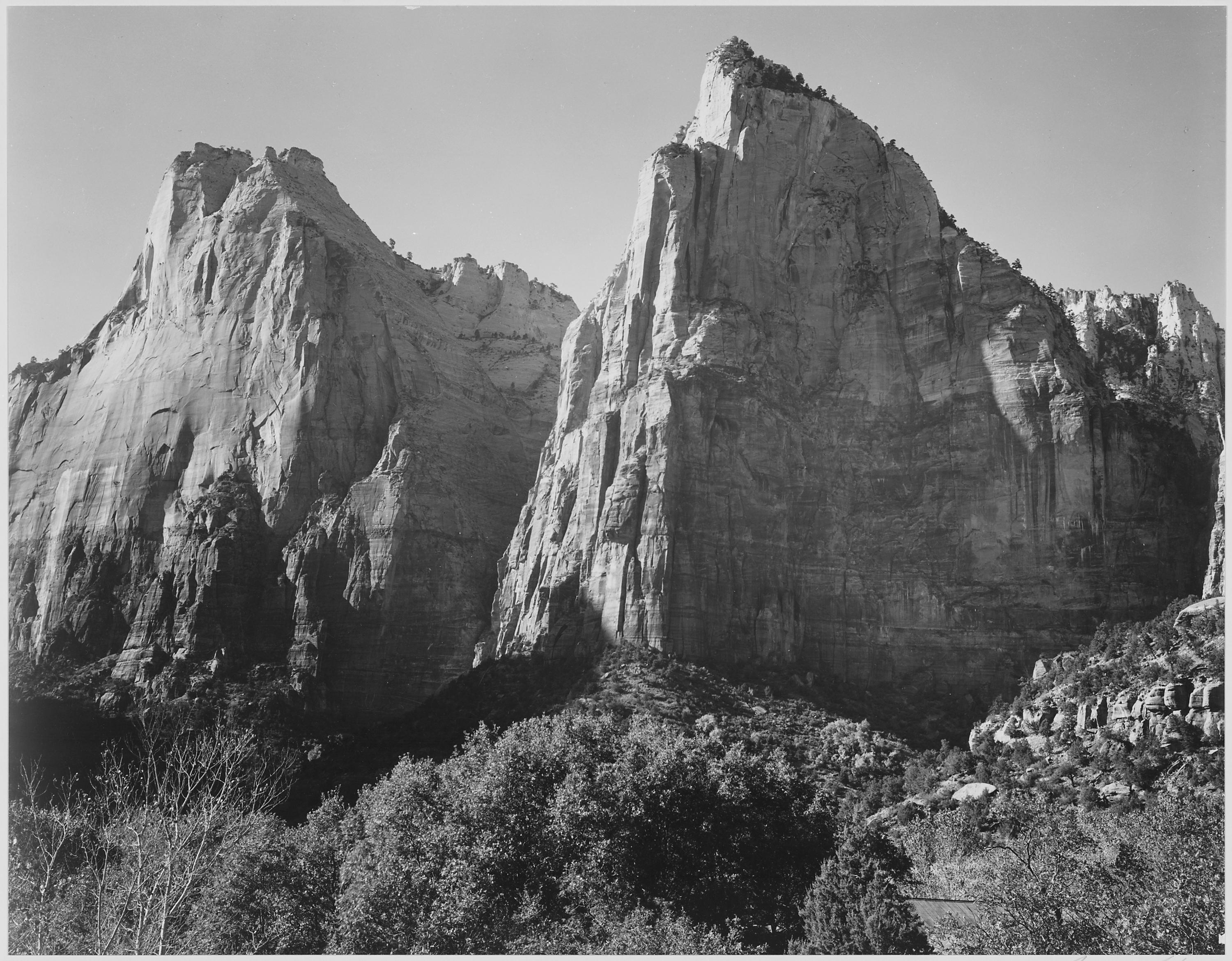
From the series Ansel Adams: Photographs of National Parks and Monuments, compiled 1941 - 1942.

== See also ==
- Geology of the Zion and Kolob canyons area
