= Three Patriarchs =

Three Sandstone monoliths in the state of Utah

Coordinates: 37.237200°N 112.965000°W

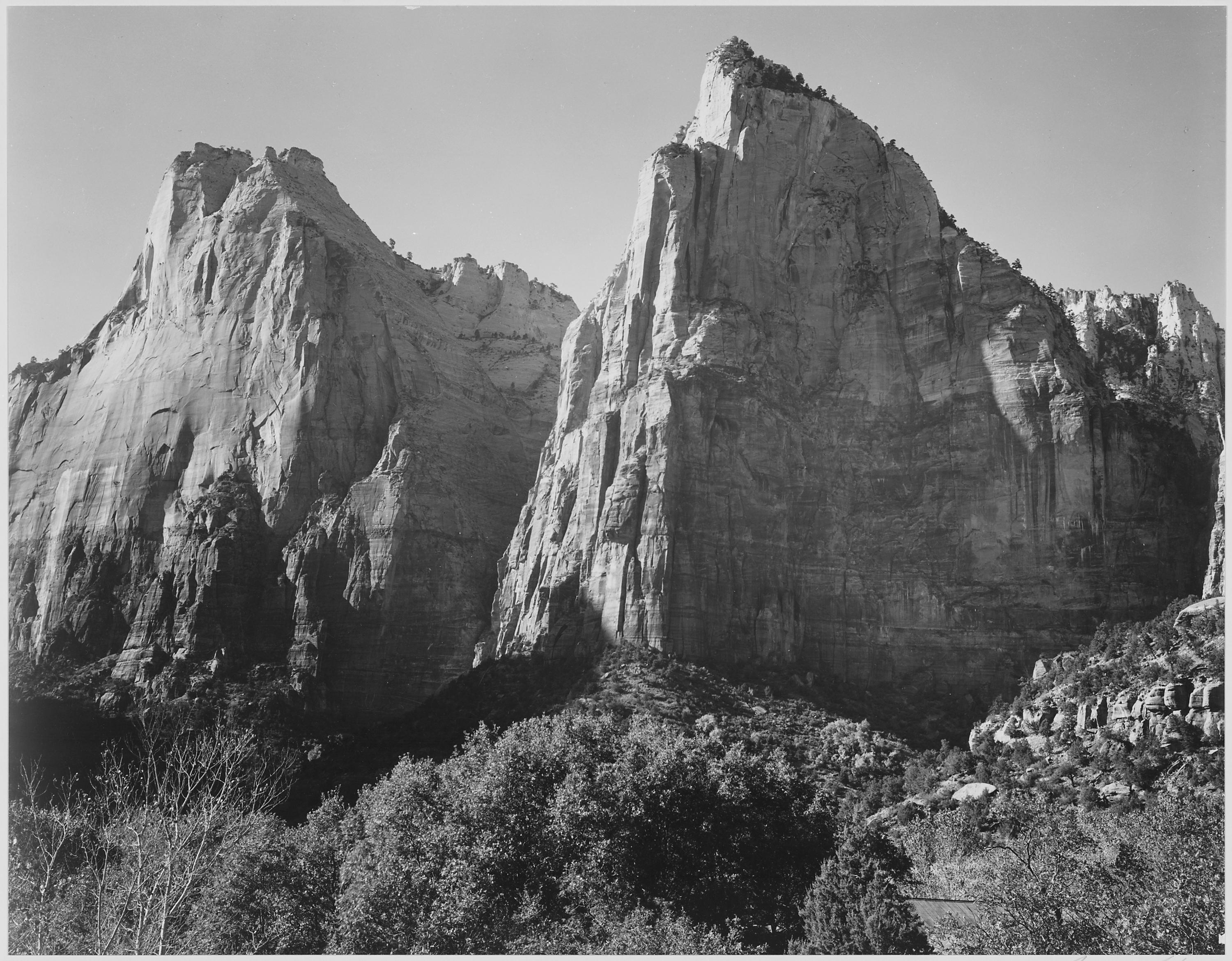
Three Patriarchs, 1933. Photo by Ansel Adams

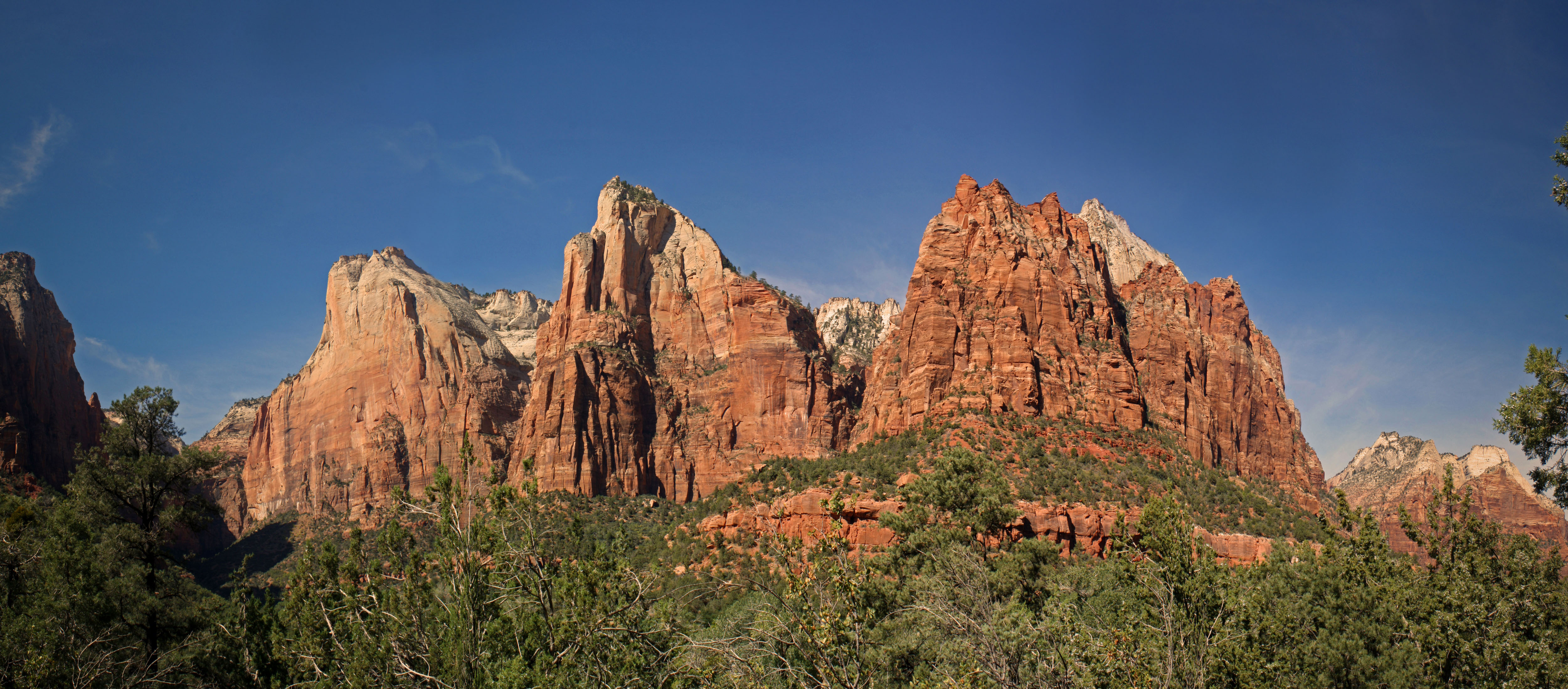
Three Patriarchs, 2010 Abraham Peak, Isaac Peak, and Mount Moroni (Jacob Peak behind Mt. Moroni)

The Three Patriarchs (formerly known as the Three Wise Men) is a set of three sandstone monoliths on the west side of Zion Canyon in Zion National Park in Washington County, Utah, United States. The three main peaks were named by Frederick Fisher in 1916 for the biblical figures Abraham, Isaac and Jacob. The Court of the Patriarchs is the cliff that runs along the south face of the Three Partiarchs.

== Climate ==
Spring and fall are the most favorable seasons to visit the Three Patriarchs. According to the Köppen climate classification system, it is located in a cold semi-arid climate zone, which is defined by the coldest month having an average mean temperature below 32 °F (0 °C), and at least 50% of the total annual precipitation being received during the spring and summer. This desert climate receives less than 10 inches (250 millimeters) of annual rainfall, and snowfall is generally light during the winter.

== Gallery ==
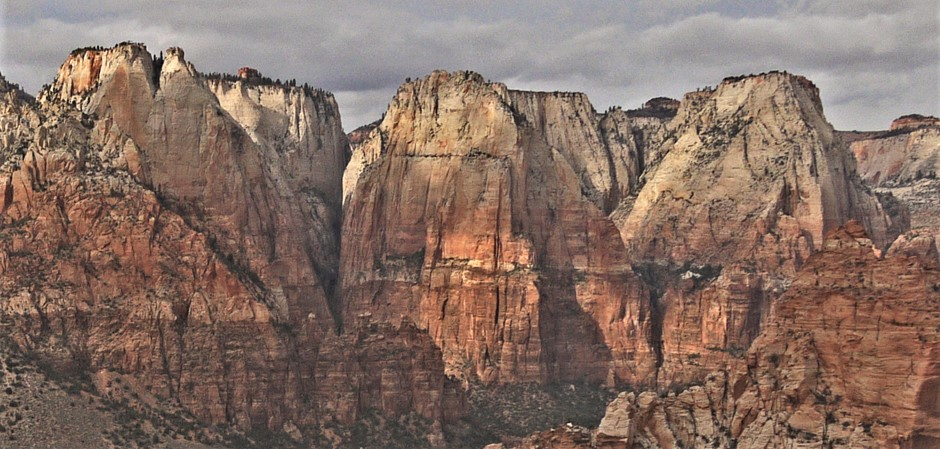
Abraham, Isaac, and Jacob peaks from Bridge Mountain, November 2013

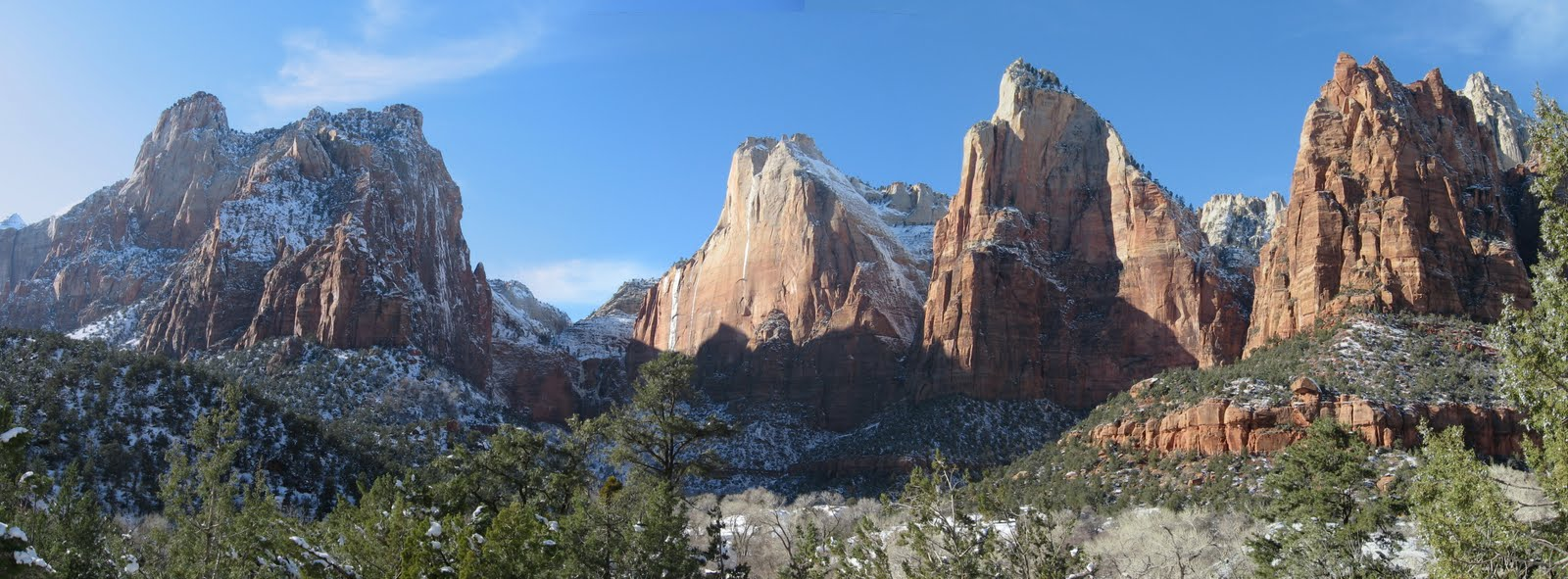
Three Patriarchs in winter. The Sentinel, Abraham Peak and Isaac Peak, Mount Moroni, January 2011

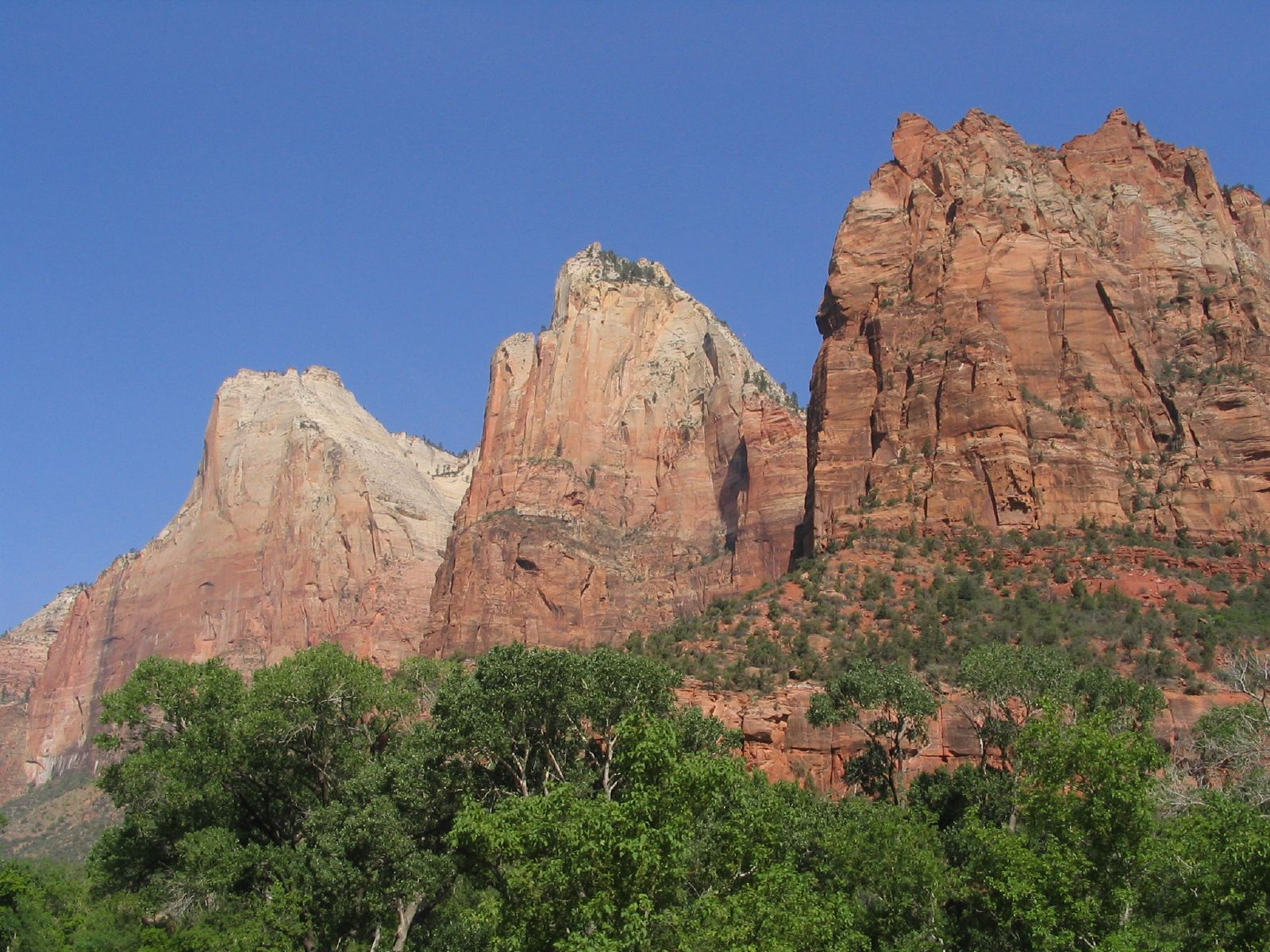
Abraham Peak, Isaac Peak, Mount Moroni, August 2007

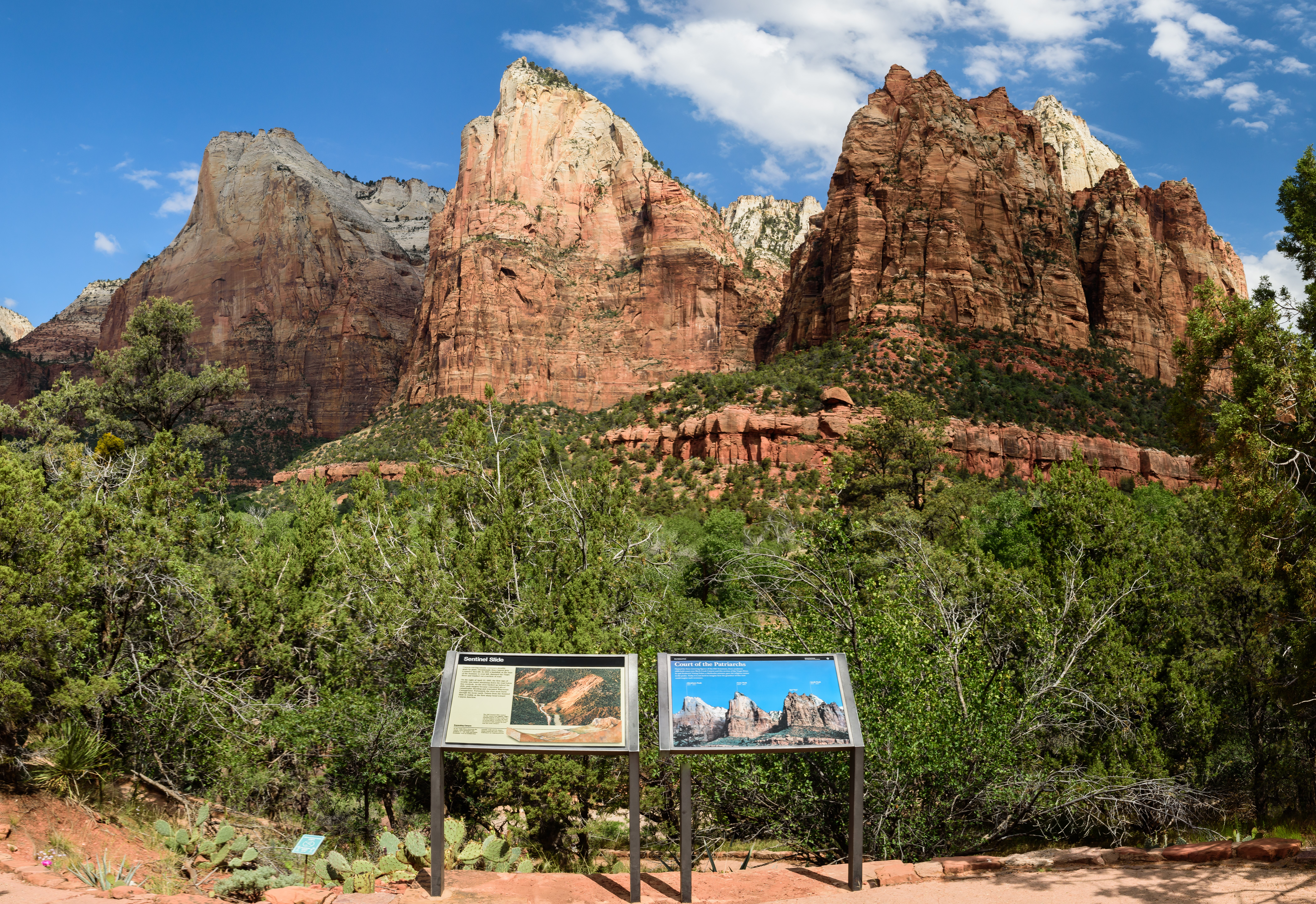
Three Patriarchs: Abraham Peak, Isaac Peak, Jacob Peak, and Mount Moroni, May 2015

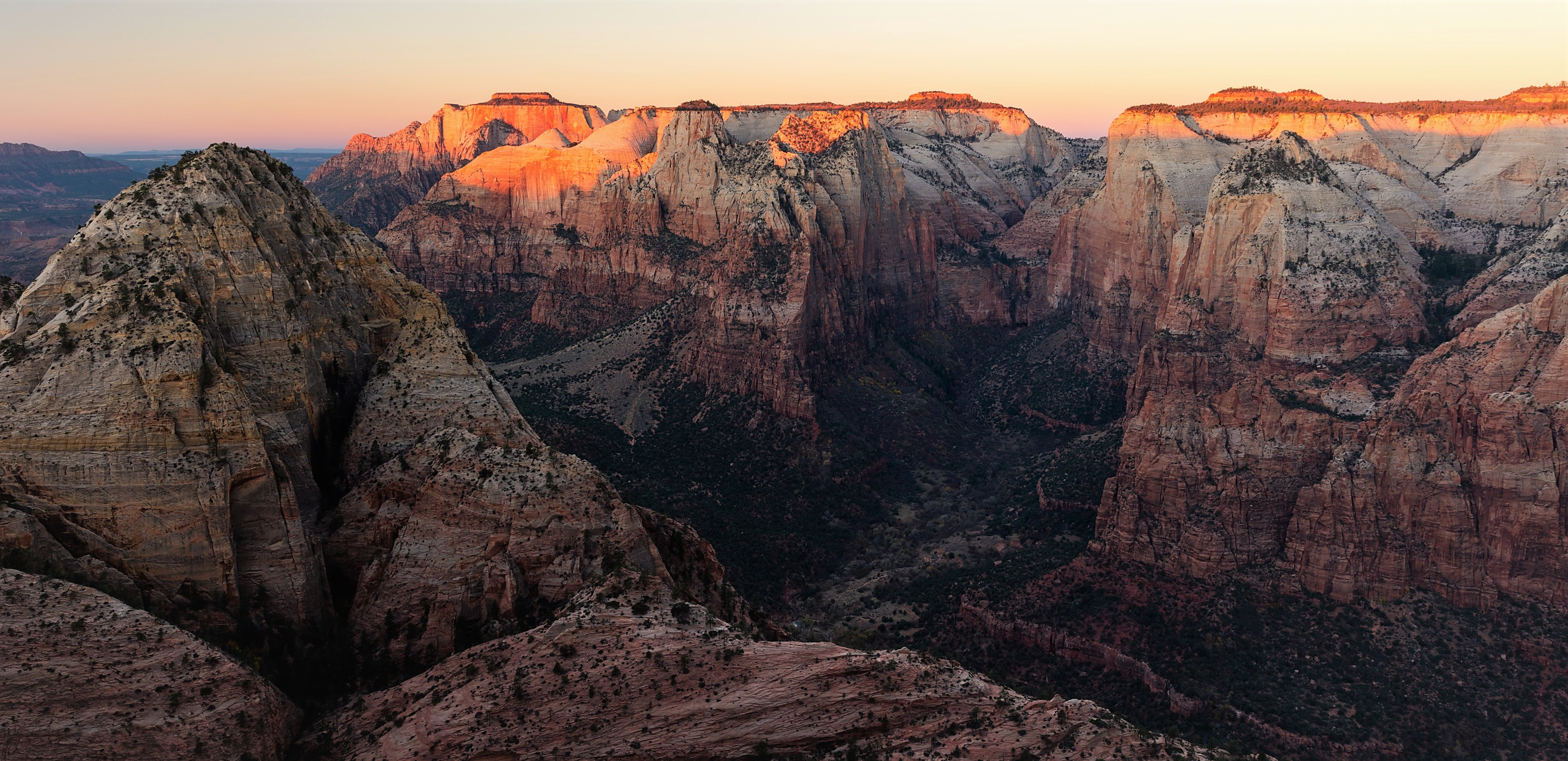
Sunrise from Deertrap Mountain. Three Patriarchs centered down below. Mountain of the Sun foreground left, November 2016

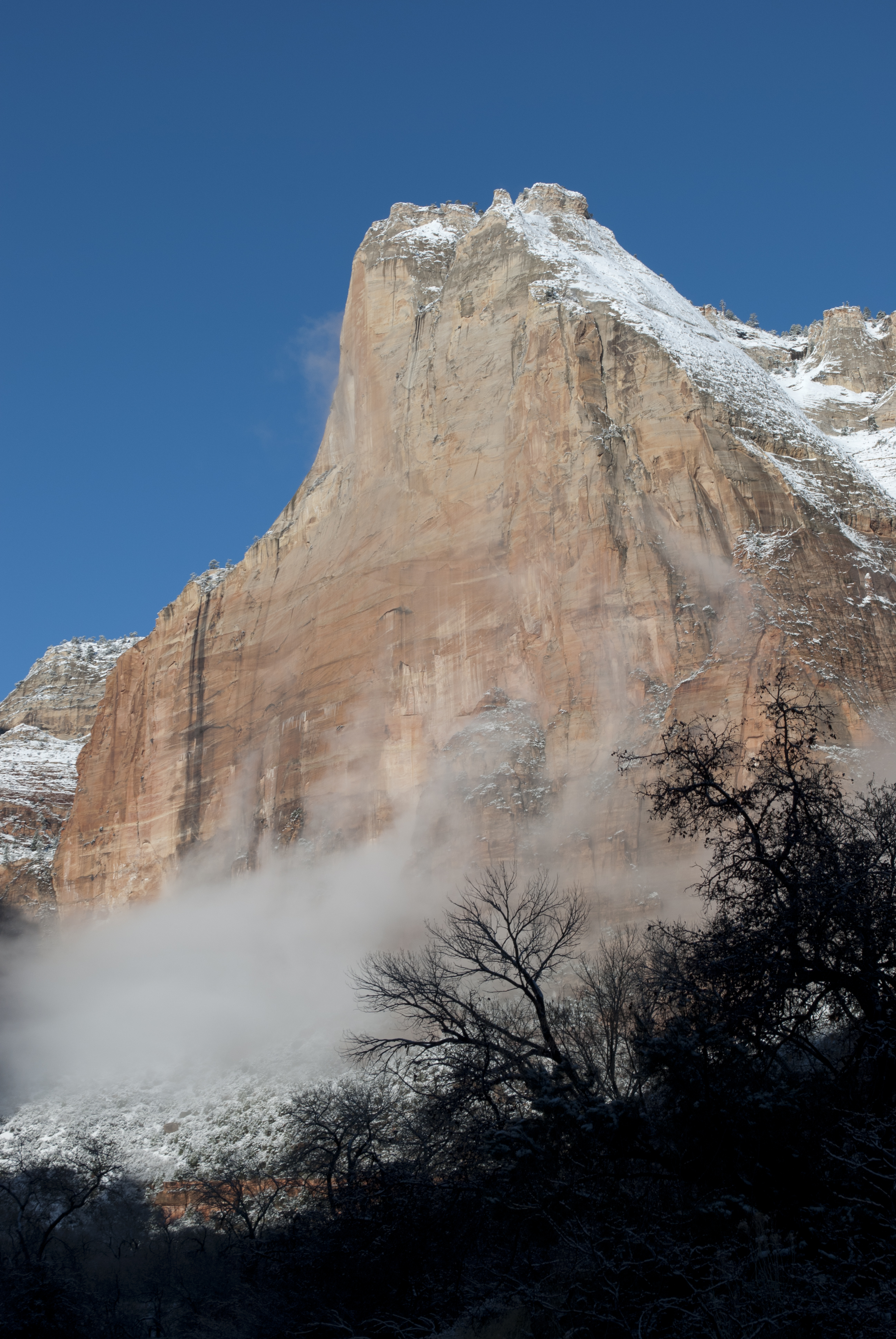
The morning light begins the thaw on Abraham Peak, the tallest of three peaks together known as Court of the Patriarchs, January 2012

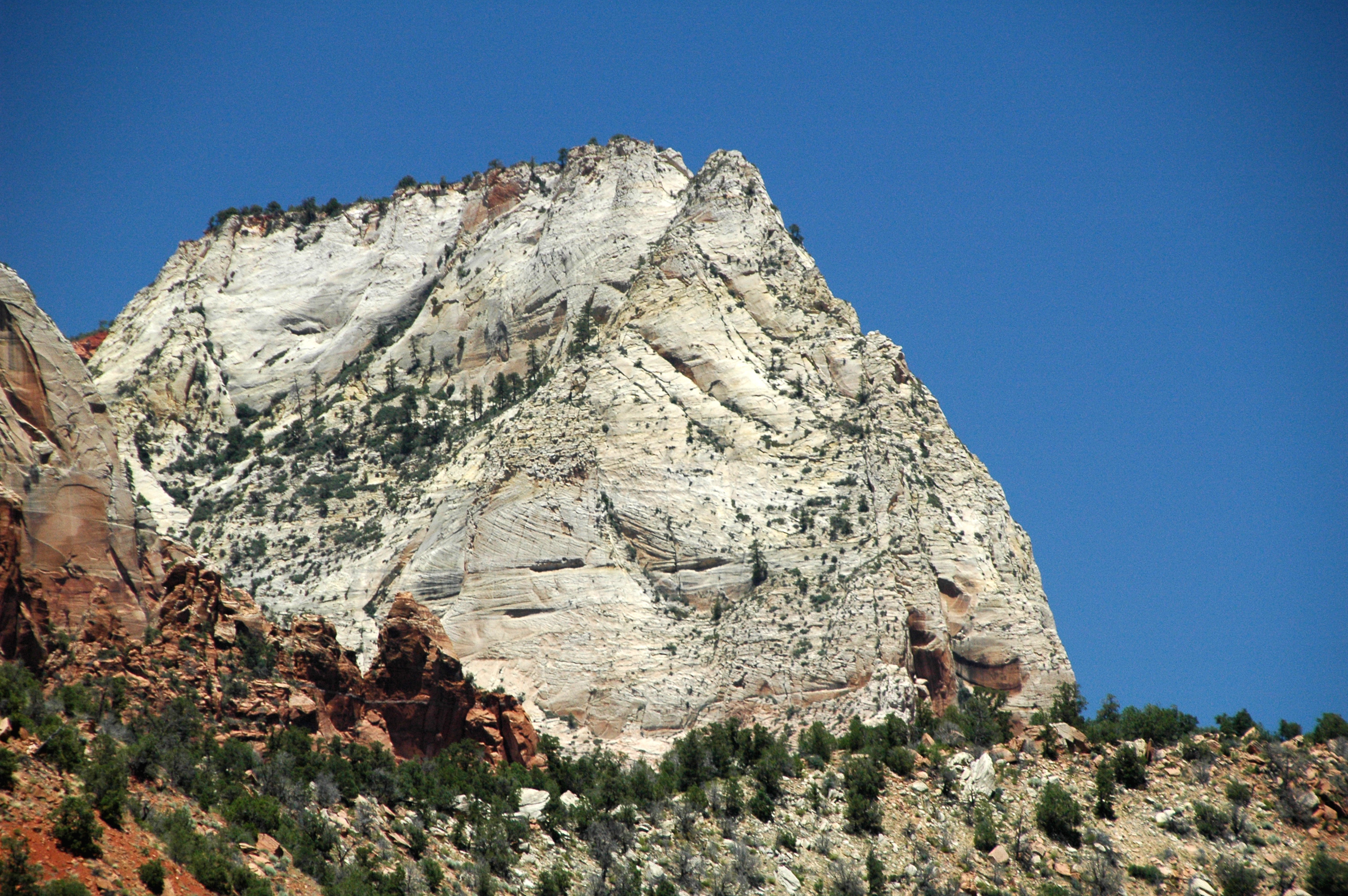
Jacob Peak, south aspect, June 2007

== See also ==
- List of Mountains in Utah
- Geology of the Zion and Kolob canyons area
- Abraham Peak
- Isaac Peak
- Jacob Peak
