= Mount Moroni =

Mountain in the state of Utah

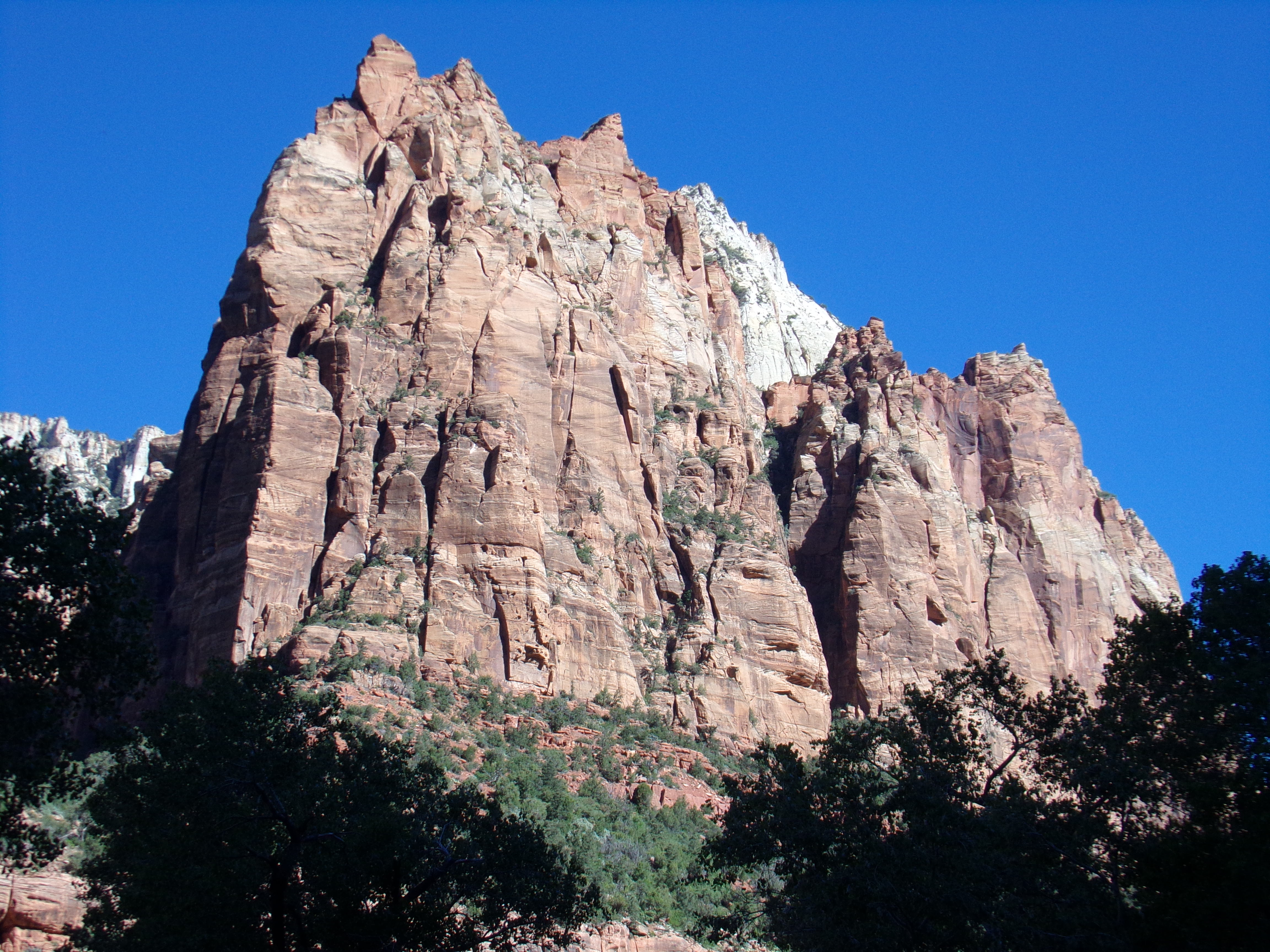
- Mount Moroni, southeast aspect, May 2017

Highest point
- Elevation: 5,690 ft (1,730 m)
- Prominence: 230 ft (70 m)
- Parent peak: Isaac Peak (6,840 ft)
- Isolation: 0.54 mi (0.87 km)
- Coordinates: 37°14′36″N 112°57′49″W

Geography
- Location within Utah Location within the United States
- Country: United States
- State: Utah
- County: Washington
- Protected area: Zion National Park
- Parent range: Colorado Plateau
- Topo map: USGS Springdale East

Geology
- Rock age: Jurassic
- Rock type: Navajo sandstone

Climbing
- Easiest route: class 5 climbing

Mount Moroni is a 5,690-foot (1,730 m) elevation Navajo Sandstone summit located at the Court of the Patriarchs in Zion National Park, in Washington County of southwest Utah, United States.

== Description ==
Mount Moroni is located immediately southwest of Zion Lodge, towering 1,400 feet (430 meters) above the lodge and the floor of Zion Canyon. It is set alongside the North Fork of the Virgin River which drains precipitation runoff from this mountain. Its neighbors include The Sentinel, Mountain of the Sun, Twin Brothers, Mount Spry, The East Temple, and the Three Patriarchs: peaks Abraham, Isaac, and Jacob. This feature's name was officially adopted in 1934 by the U.S. Board on Geographic Names. It is named for Angel Moroni, who presented Joseph Smith with the golden plates from which he translated and published the Book of Mormon.

== Climate ==
Spring and fall are the most favorable seasons to visit Mount Moroni. According to the Köppen climate classification system, it is located in a Cold semi-arid climate zone, which is defined by the coldest month having an average mean temperature below 32 °F (0 °C), and at least 50% of the total annual precipitation being received during the spring and summer. This desert climate receives less than 10 inches (250 millimeters) of annual rainfall, and snowfall is generally light during the winter.

== Climbing Routes ==
Climbing Routes on Mount Moroni include:

- Road to Cumorah - IV class 5.11 C1 - 10 pitches
- The Groper - III class 5.10a - 6 pitches
- Forced Issue - III/IV class 5.10+ R - 9 pitches
- Varco Route - II class 5.11 - 2 pitches
- Voice From The Dust - III class 5.11 - 9 pitches
- Plan B - IV class 5.12 - 9 pitches
- Molecules of Emotion - IV class 5.12b - 6 pitches
- Crack in the Cosmic Egg - V class 5.8 C2 - 6 pitches

== Gallery ==
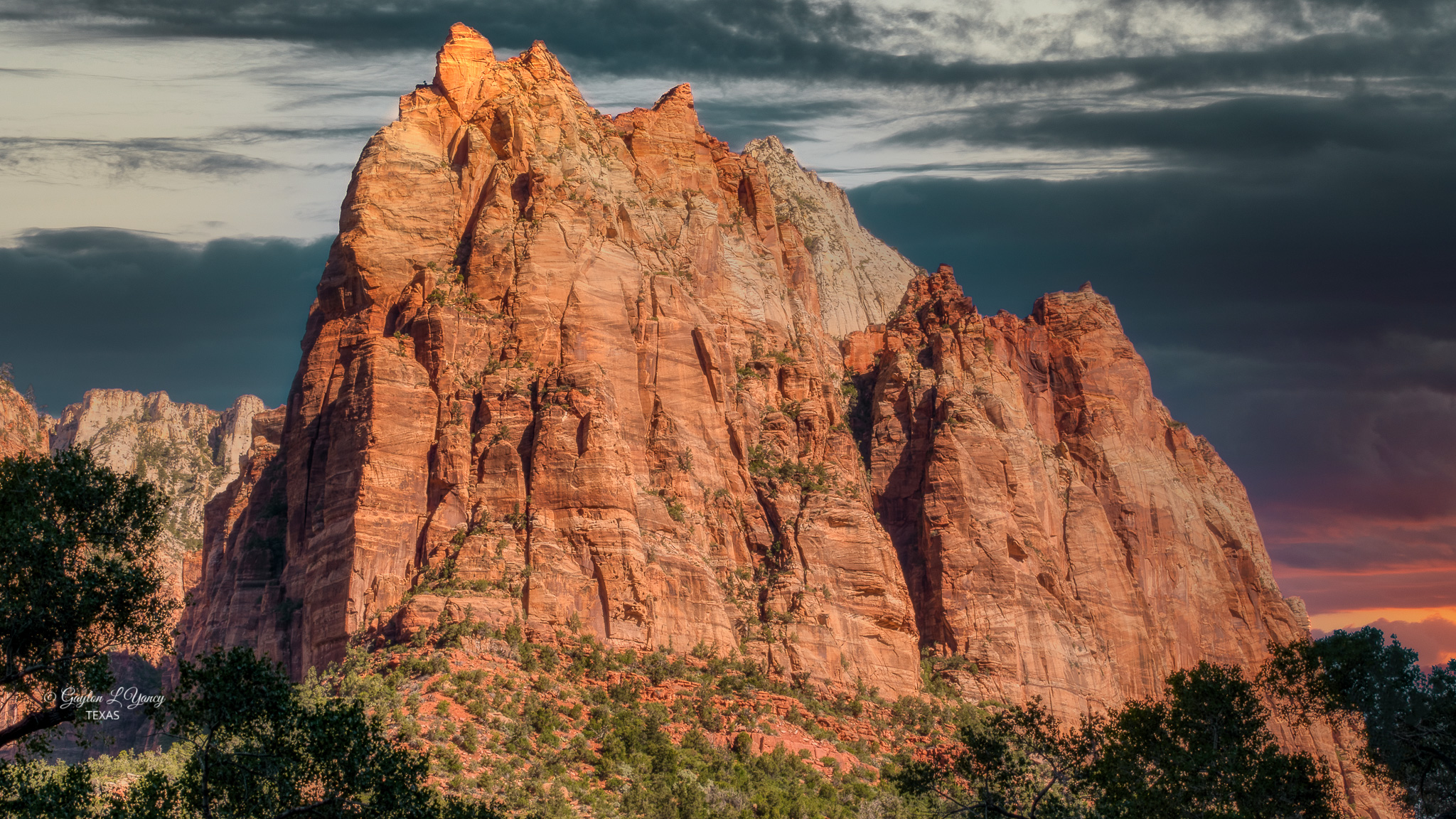

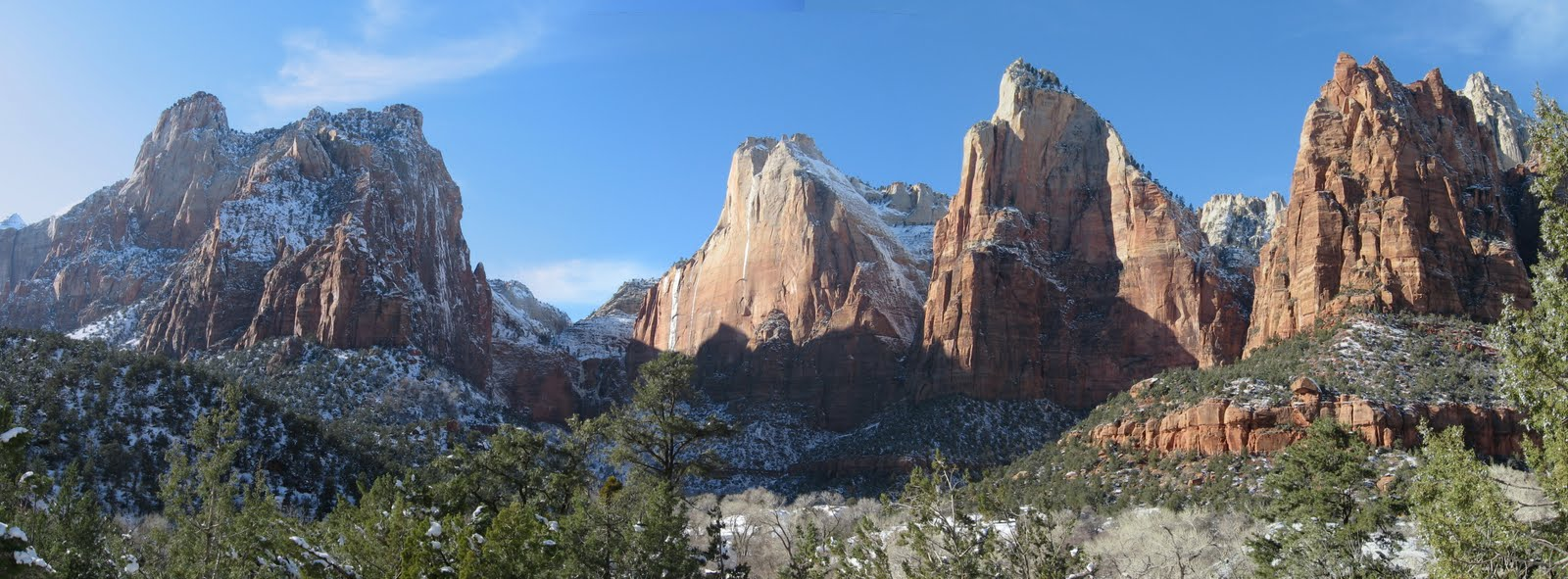
Court of the Patriarchs in winter. The Sentinel, Abraham, Isaac, and Moroni (right)

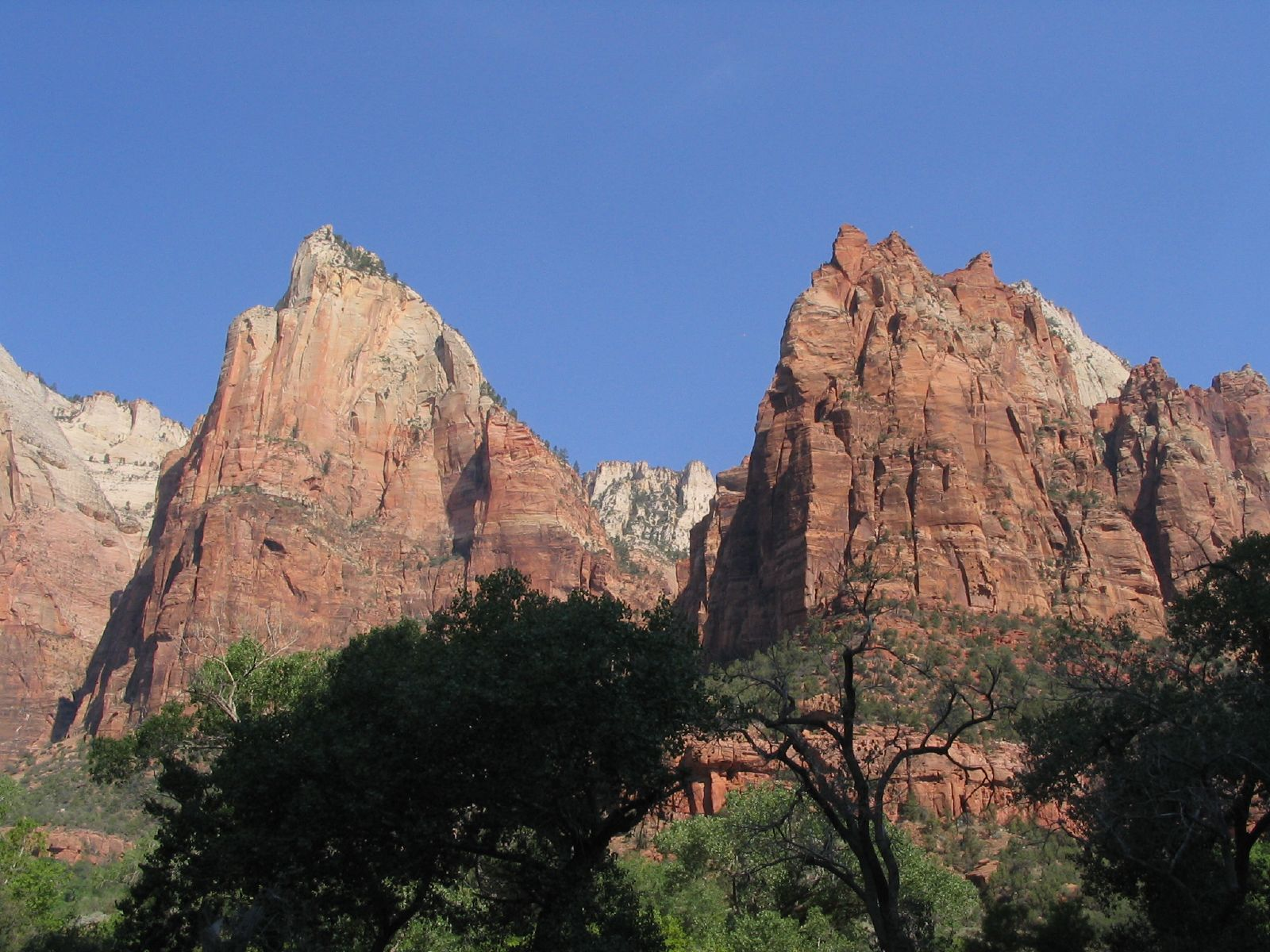
Isaac and Mt. Moroni

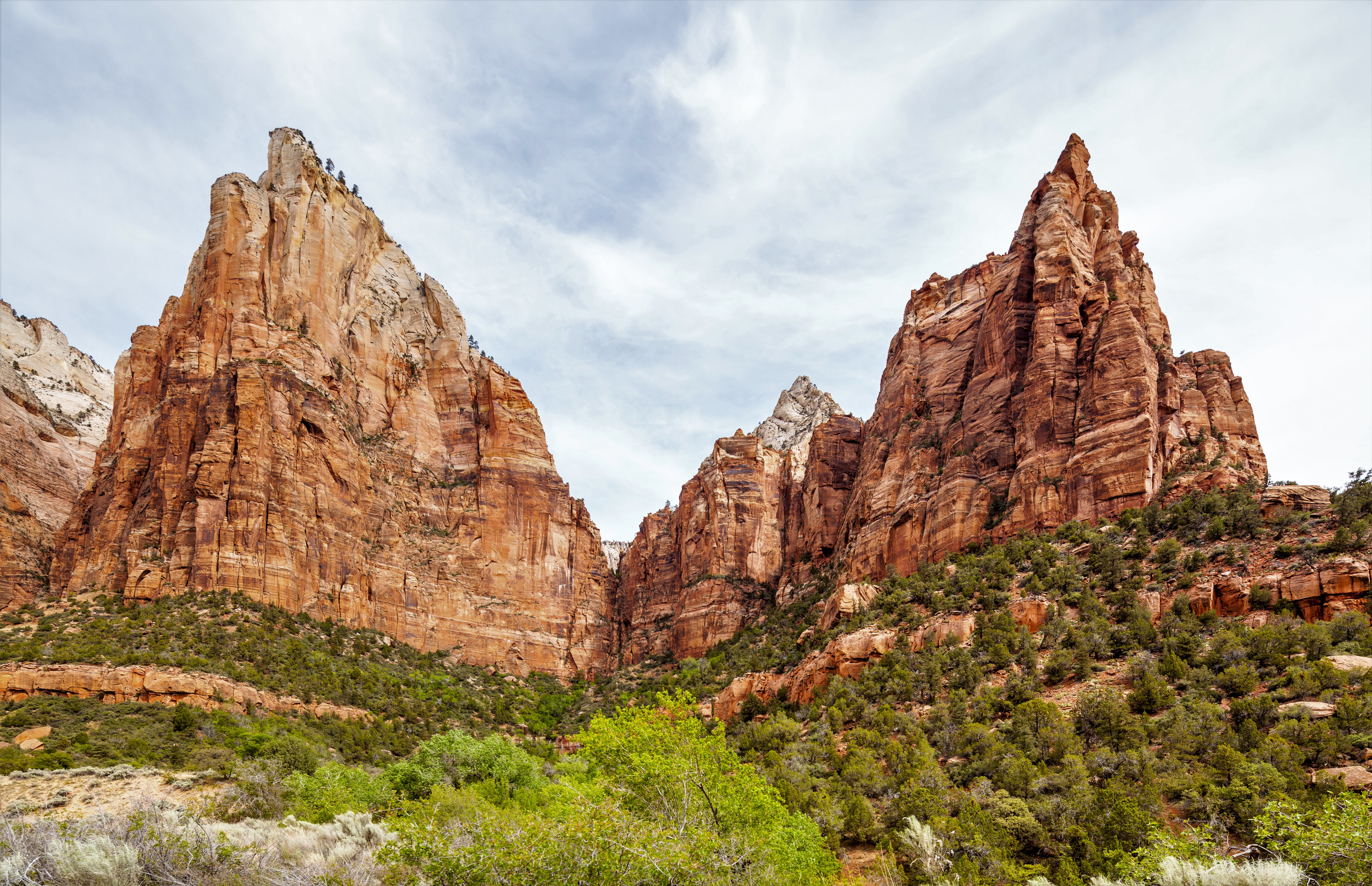
Isaac (left), Moroni (right)

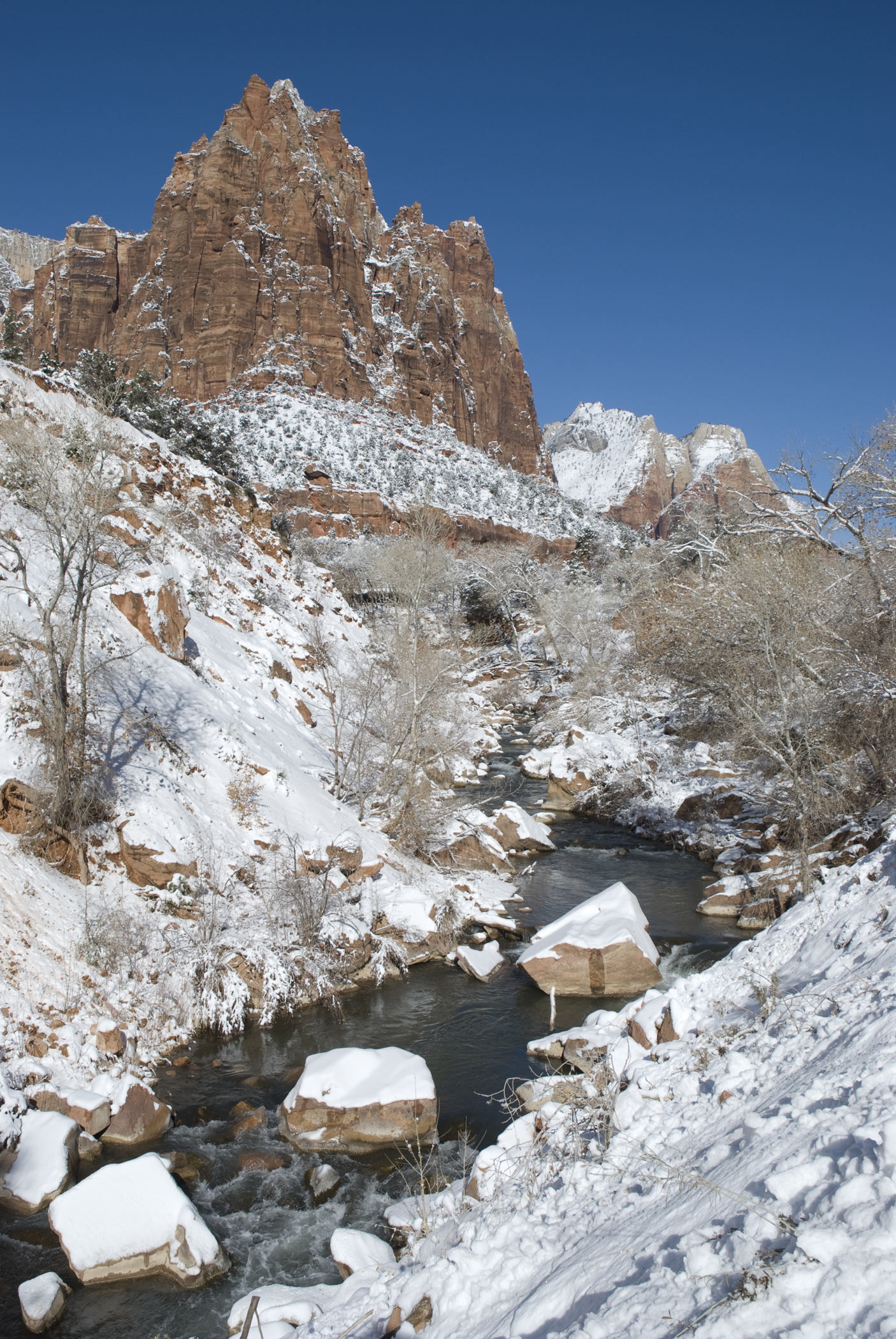
Mt. Moroni winter snow

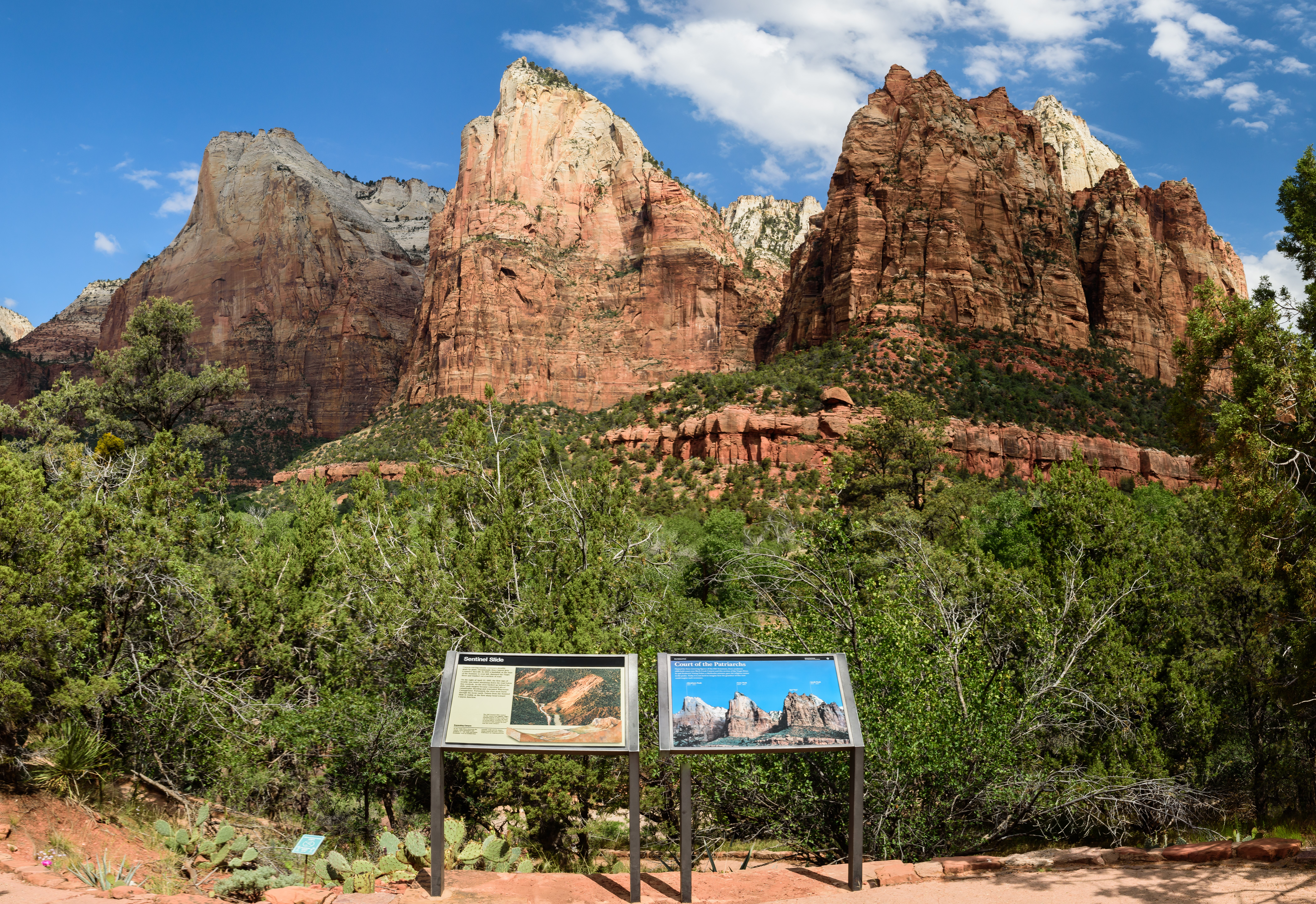
Court of the Patriarchs. Abraham, Isaac, Mt. Moroni

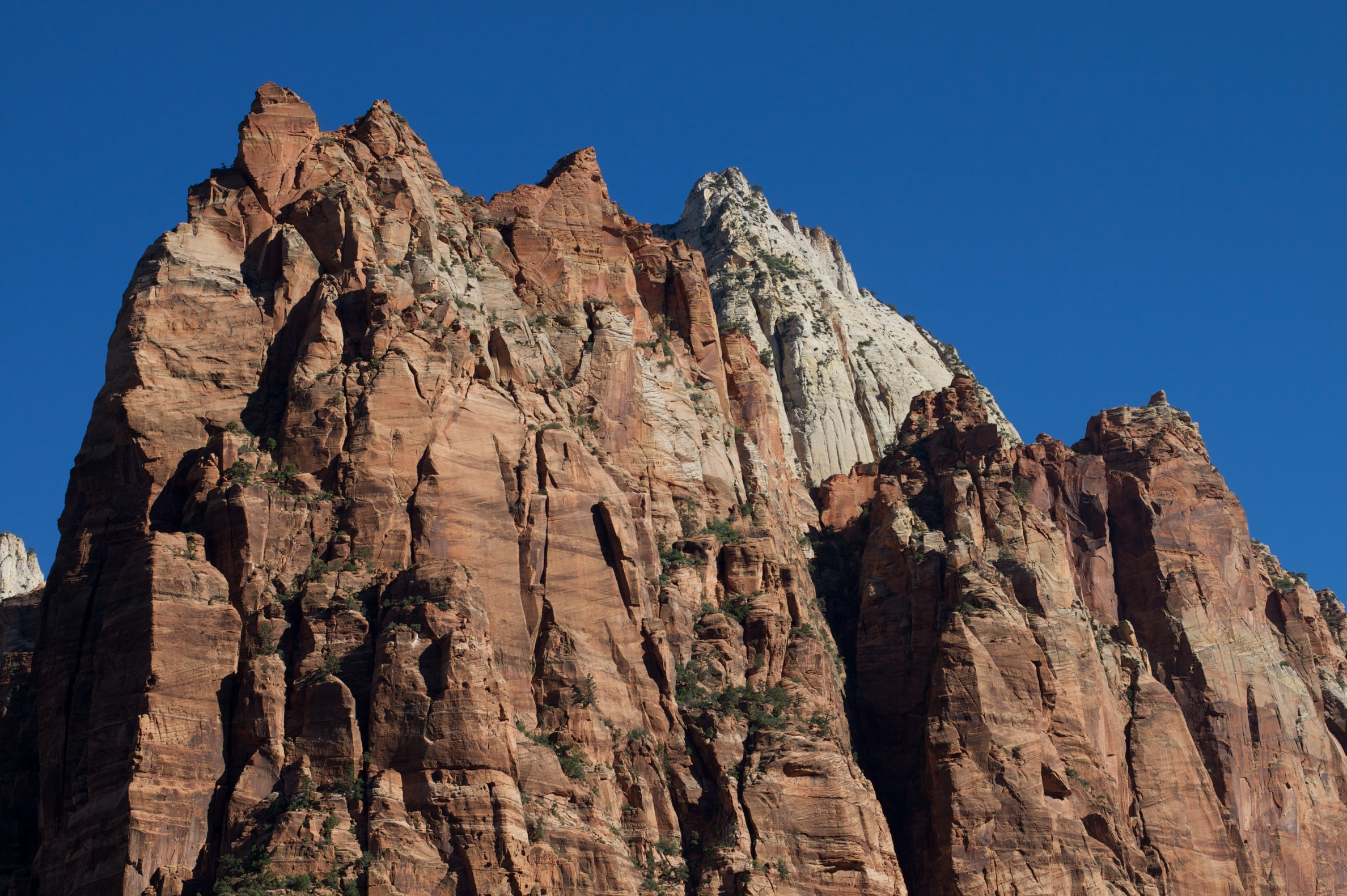
Moroni, with the white rock of Jacob in back

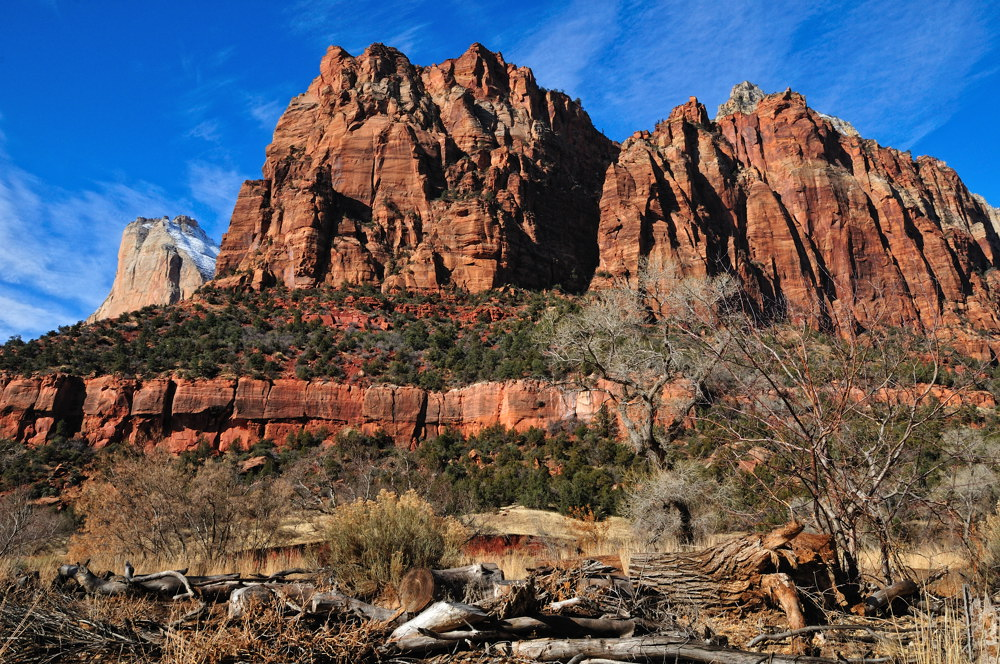

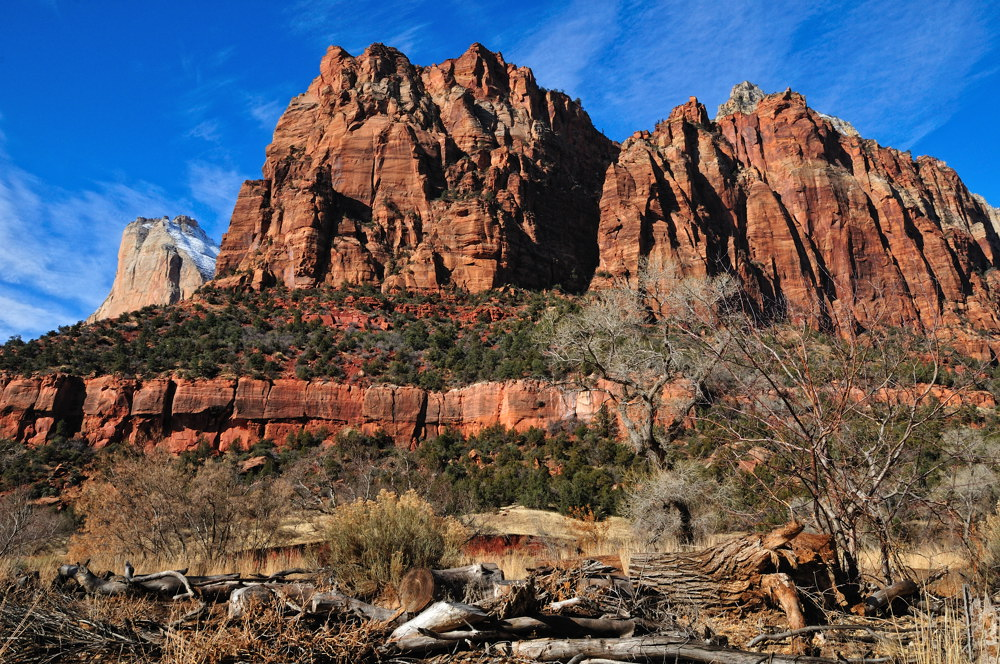
Abraham Peak (left) with Mount Moroni (center).

== See also ==
- List of mountains in Utah
- Geology of the Zion and Kolob canyons area
- Colorado Plateau
