= Isaac Peak =

Mountain in the state of Utah

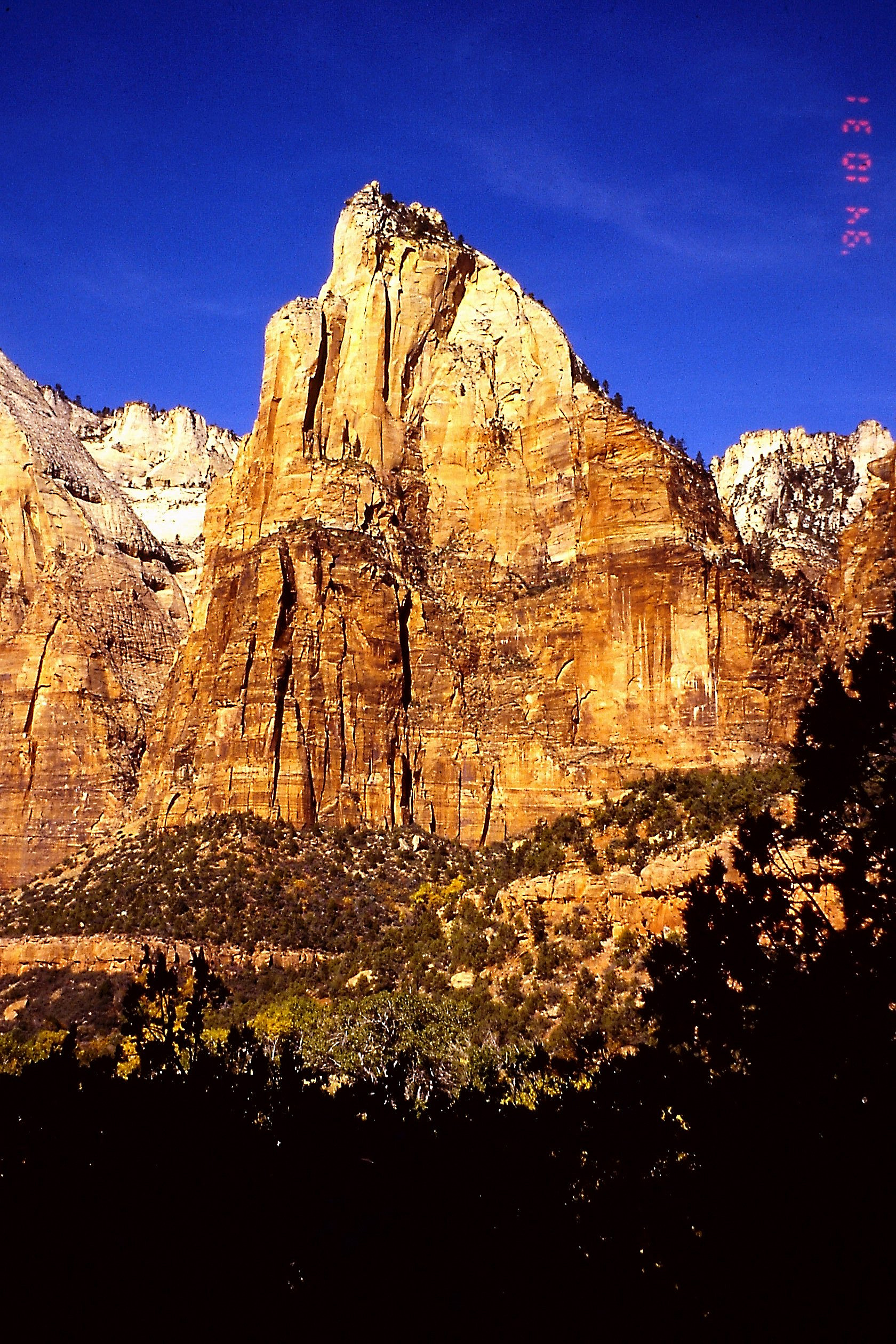
- South face, Isaac Peak

Highest point
- Elevation: 6,726 ft (2,050 m)
- Prominence: 840 ft (260 m)
- Isolation: 0.59 mi (0.95 km)
- Coordinates: 37°14′41.5″N 112°58′22.9″W

Geography
- Location within Utah Location within the United States
- Location: Zion National Park, Washington County, Utah
- Topo map: USGS Springdale East

Geology
- Rock age: Jurassic
- Mountain type: Monolith
- Rock type: Navajo Sandstone

Climbing
- First ascent: Jeff Lowe, Wick Beavers, John Weiland, and Mike Weiss (1972, Freeloader); John Middendorf, Brad Quinn, and Bill Hatcher (1992: Trick of the Trade)
- Easiest route: Tricks of the Trade

Isaac Peak is a 6,726-foot (2,050 m) rock formation in Zion National Park in Washington County, Utah, United States. Access to Isaac Peak is from the main Park road through Sand Beach Trail. Isaac Peak is part of the Three Patriarchs in between Abraham Peak and Jacob Peak. Between Isaac Peak and Abraham Peak is Isaac Canyon, accessed by climbing up the South Fork of Heaps Canyon.

== Name ==
Zion National Park was first named Mukuntuweapo National Monument by Geologist John Wesley Powell. Explorer Frederick Samuel Dellenbaugh, a companion to Powell's, illustrated and wrote about the park in Scribner's Magazine, giving publicity to the region. Shortly afterward, Methodist minister Frederick Vining Fisher explored the park along with two Latter-Day Saints youth and among them named many of the peaks in the park. Along with its neighbor peaks, names were chosen from biblical patriarchs. The name for Isaac Peak was suggested by Claud Hirschi, one of the youth with Fisher and named after Isaac.

== Climbing routes ==
Isaac Peak has several recognized rock climbing routes. Tricks of the Trade, also known as Tricks of the Tramp (1,800’, V class 5.10 C2) located at the base of the main chimney system. Sands of Time is located starting on a prominent crack to the left of Tricks of the Trade (VI class 5.10 A3). The route climbs the south face of the main buttress although it doesn't complete at the summit. Other routes include Freeloader (V class 5.12 D) and Iron Like a Lion in Zion (IV/V class 5.11 b/c).

Isaac Peak is a location identified as a nesting area for raptors and as a consequence, closed for climbing during nesting seasons.

== See also ==
- List of mountains in Utah
- The Watchman (Utah)
- Mount Moroni
