= The Watchman (Utah) =

Mountain in Zion National Park

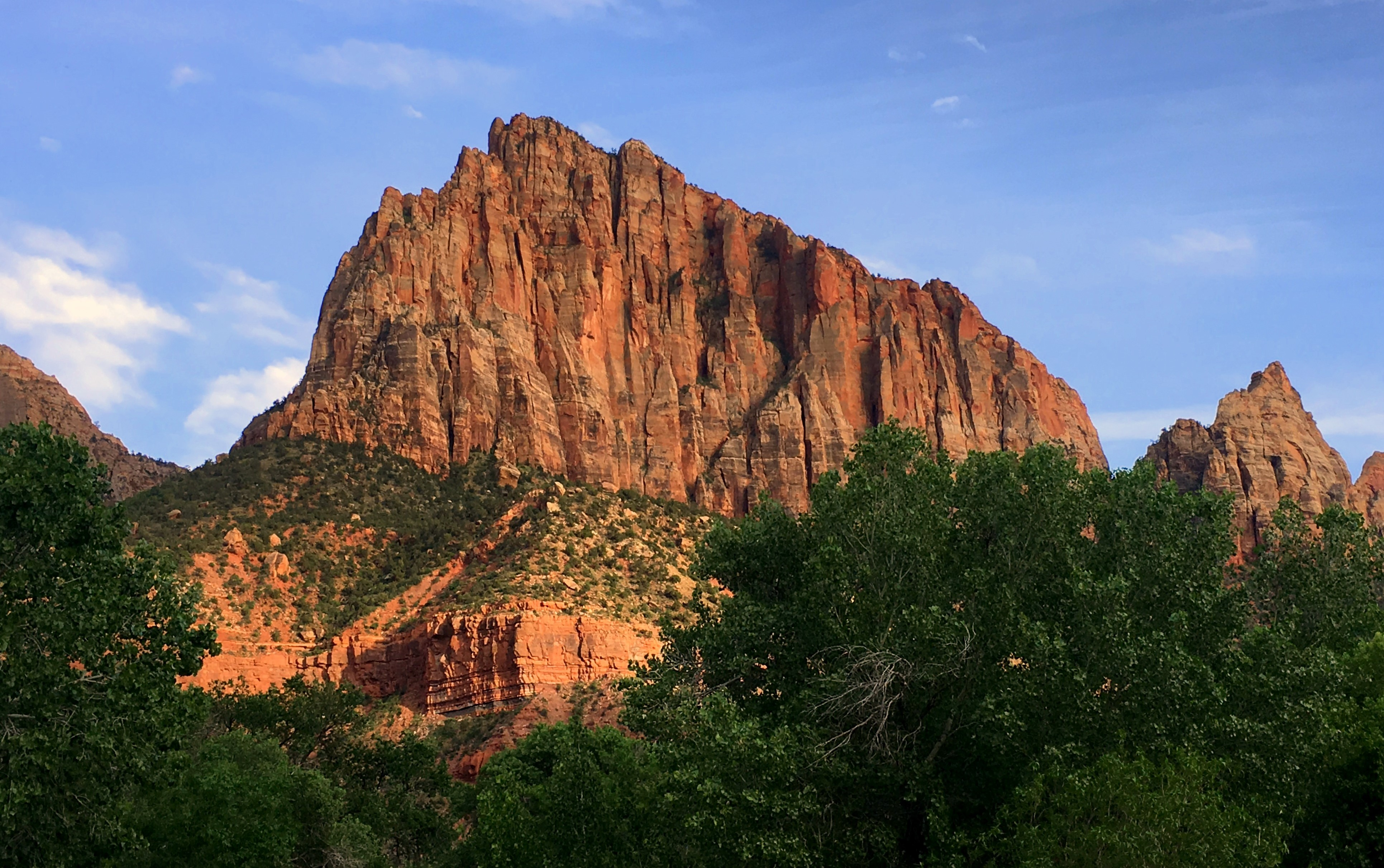
- The Watchman, northwest aspect

Highest point
- Elevation: 6,545 ft (1,995 m)
- Prominence: 785 ft (239 m)
- Parent peak: Stevens Peak (6,555 ft)
- Isolation: 0.79 mi (1.27 km)
- Coordinates: 37°11′05″N 112°58′47″W

Geography
- Location within Utah Location within the United States
- Country: United States
- State: Utah
- County: Washington County
- Protected area: Zion National Park
- Parent range: Colorado Plateau
- Topo map: USGS Springdale East

Geology
- Rock age: Jurassic
- Rock type: Navajo sandstone

Climbing
- First ascent: 1973 by Jeff Lowe, Mike Weis
- Easiest route: class 4 scrambling West Face

The Watchman is a 6,545-foot (1,995 m) sandstone mountain summit located in Zion National Park, in Washington County of southwest Utah, United States.

== Description ==
The Watchman is located immediately east of Springdale, towering 2,600 feet (790 meters) above the town and the floor of Zion Canyon. Zion's park headquarters, the park's south entrance, and Watchman Campground are situated immediately north-northwest of the mountain, which makes it one of the photographic icons of the park. The Watchman is wedged between the North and East Forks of the Virgin River, which drain precipitation runoff from this mountain. Its neighbours include Mount Kinesava directly across the canyon to the west, Bridge Mountain, 1.66 mi (2.67 km) to the north-northeast, and The West Temple is positioned 2.9 mi (4.7 km) to the northwest. This feature's name was officially adopted in 1934 by the U.S. Board on Geographic Names. It is believed to be so named because it stands as a watchman guarding the south entrance to the park. It is unclear where the name may have originated; some believe it was Methodist Minister Frederick Vining Fisher. Early pioneers called this peak Flanigan Peak, named after the Flanigan family, whose homestead sat at its base. This mountain is composed of Navajo Sandstone, with a red shale outcropping of the Kayenta Formation along the lower slopes.

== Climate ==
Spring and fall are the most favorable seasons to visit The Watchman. According to the Köppen climate classification system, it is located in a Cold semi-arid climate zone, which is defined by the coldest month having an average mean temperature below 32 °F (0 °C), and at least 50% of the total annual precipitation being received during the spring and summer. This desert climate receives less than 10 inches (250 millimeters) of annual rainfall, and snowfall is generally light during the winter.

== Gallery ==
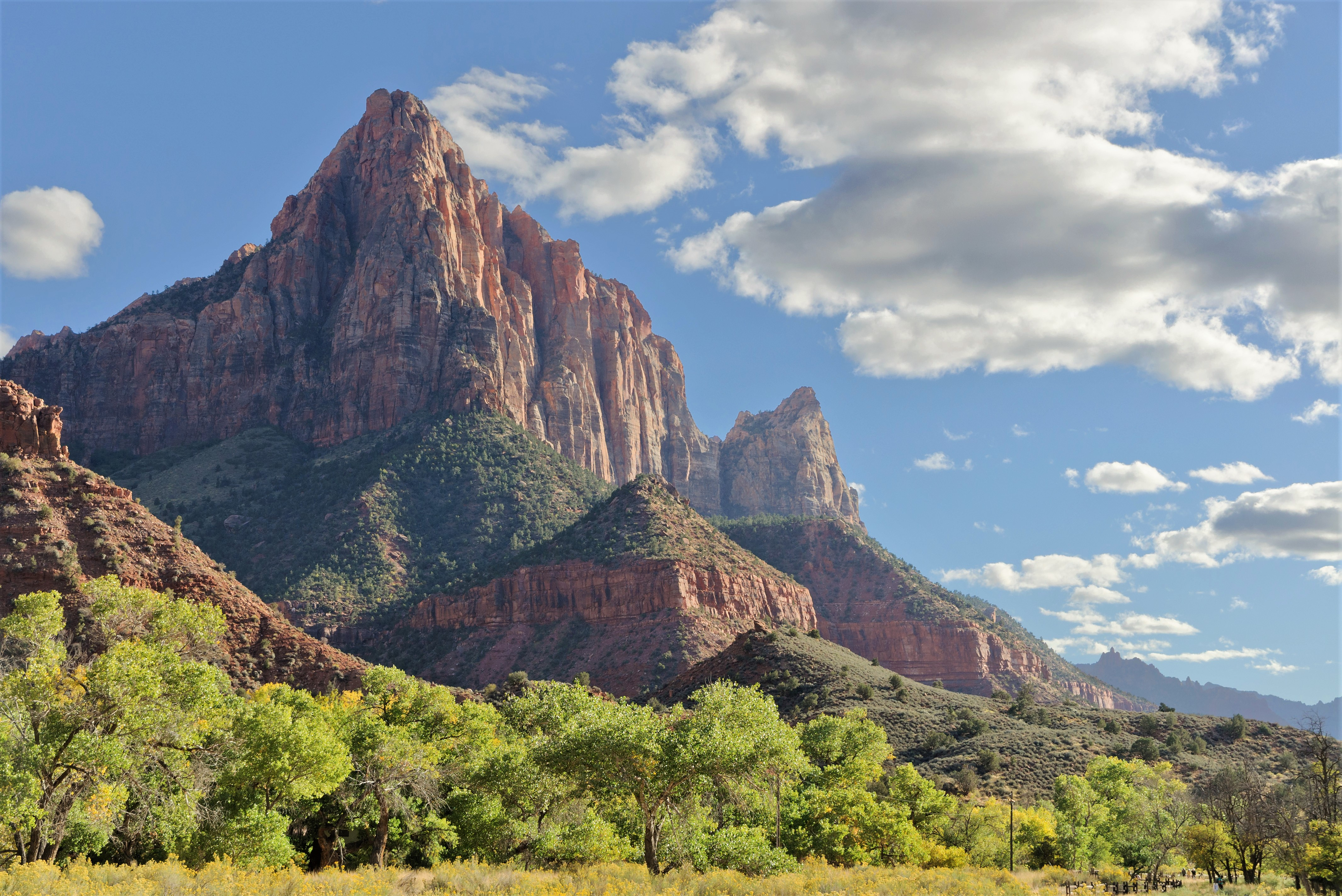

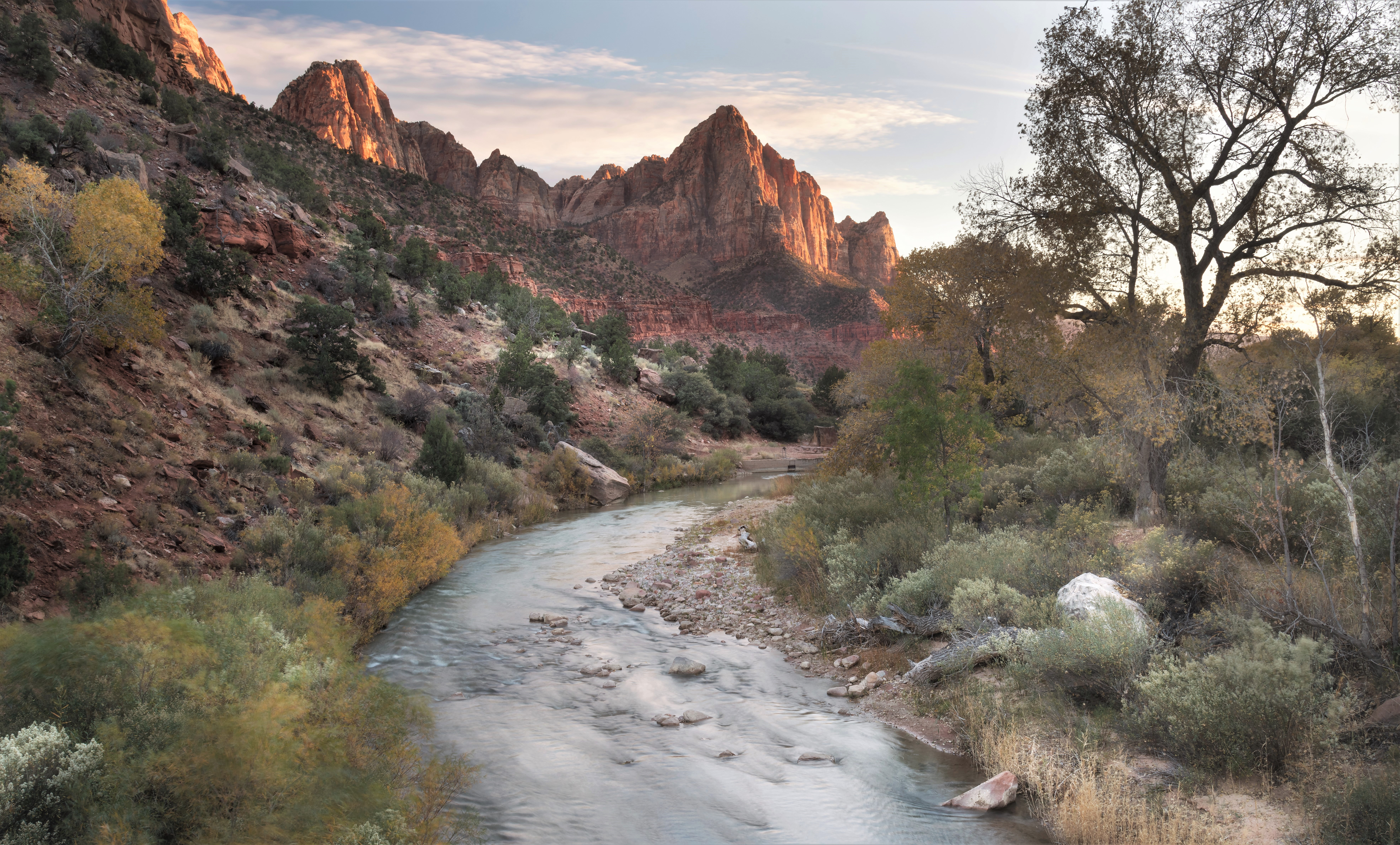
The Watchman and North Fork Virgin River from the north

West aspect seen from Springdale, Johnson Mountain to the right. (very large file)

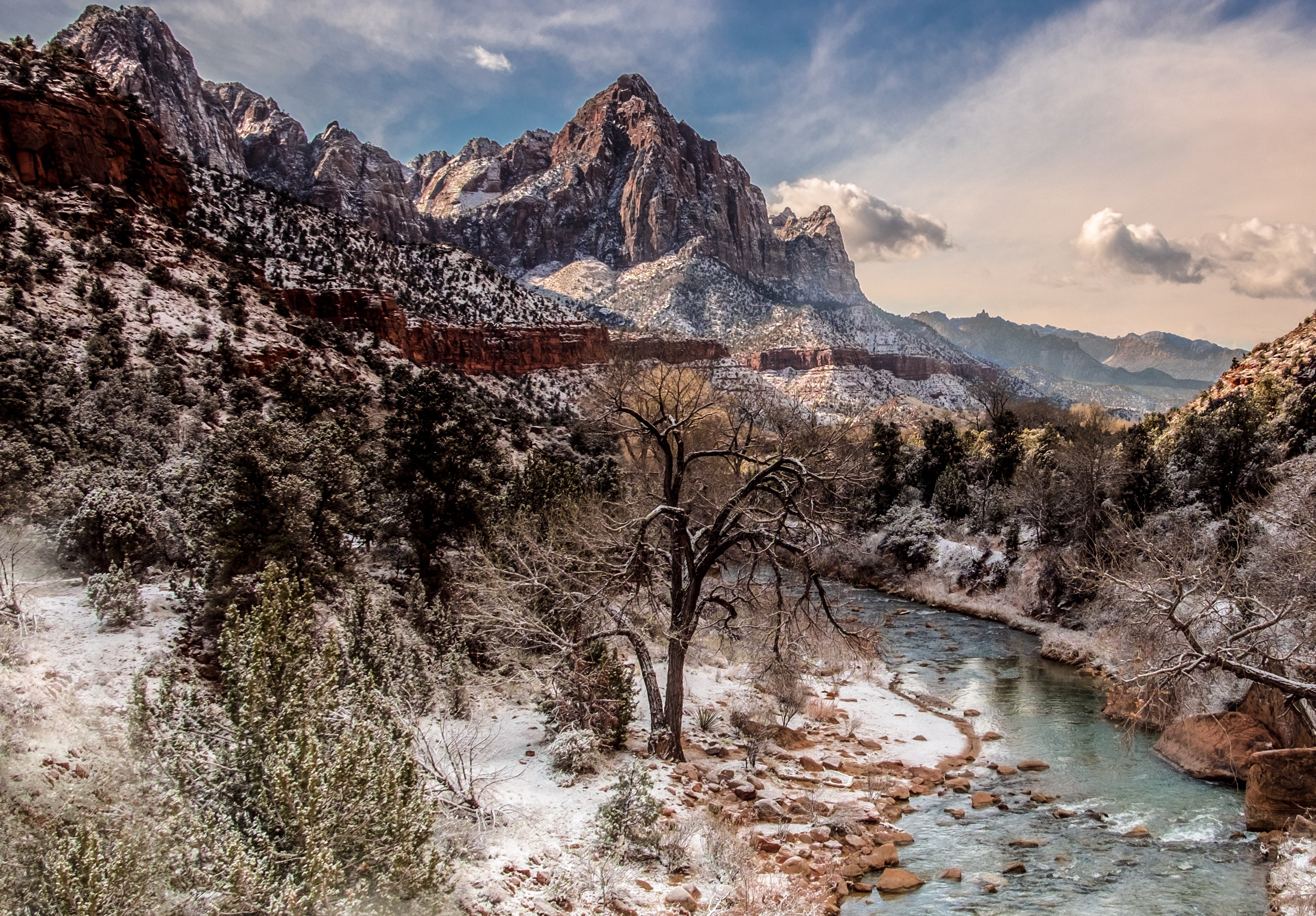
A dusting of snow at The Watchman

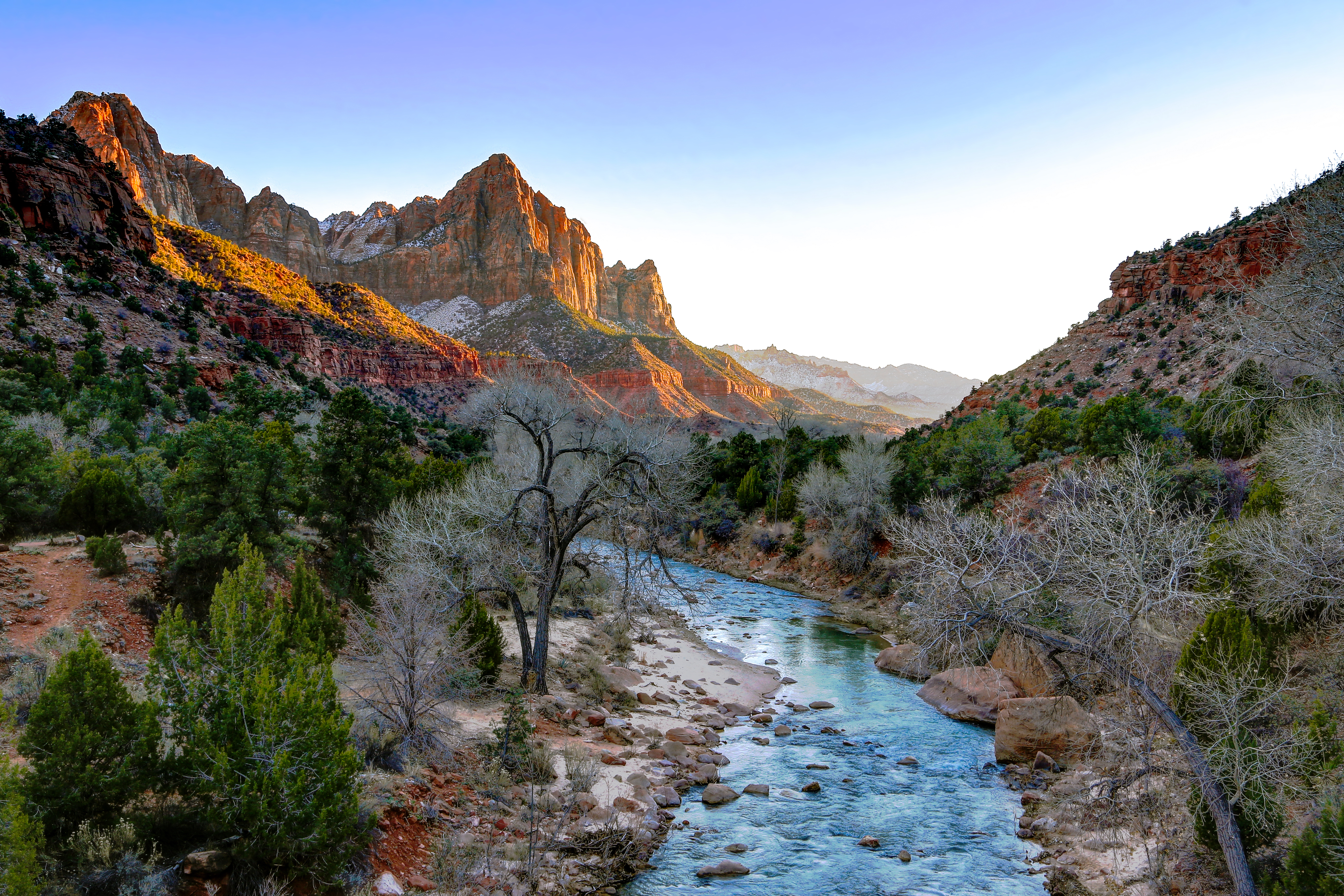
The Watchman and North Fork Virgin River

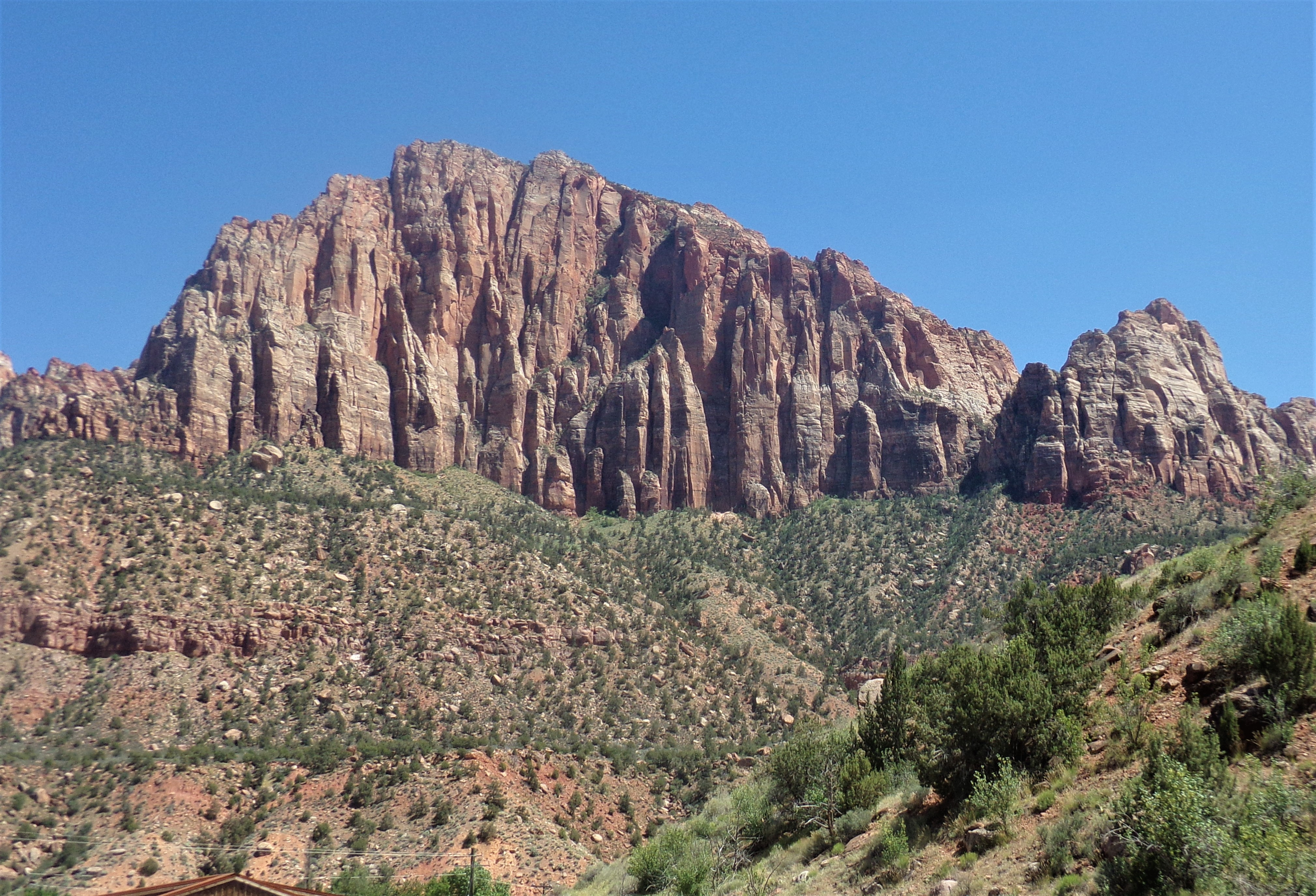

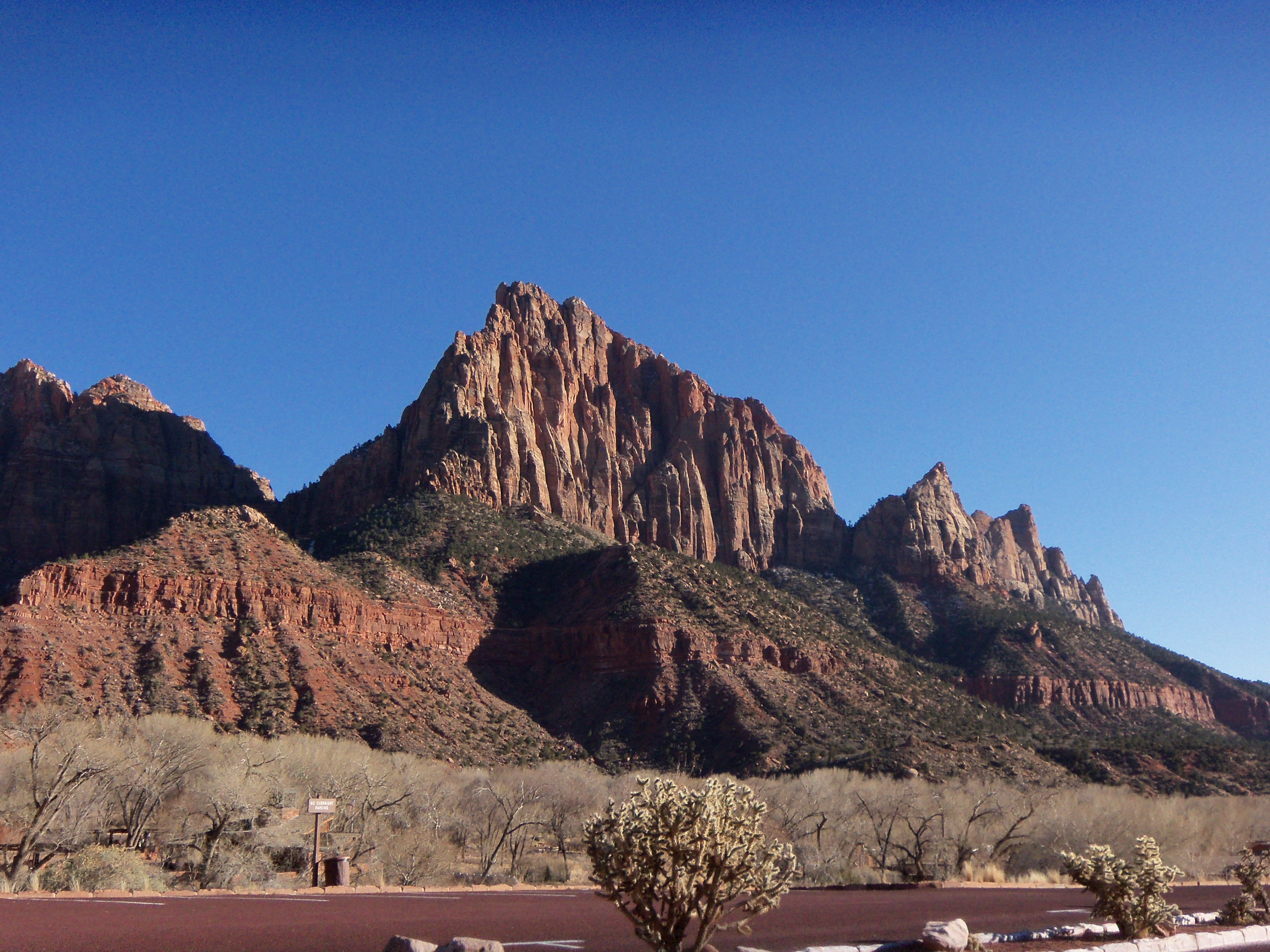
from park headquarters

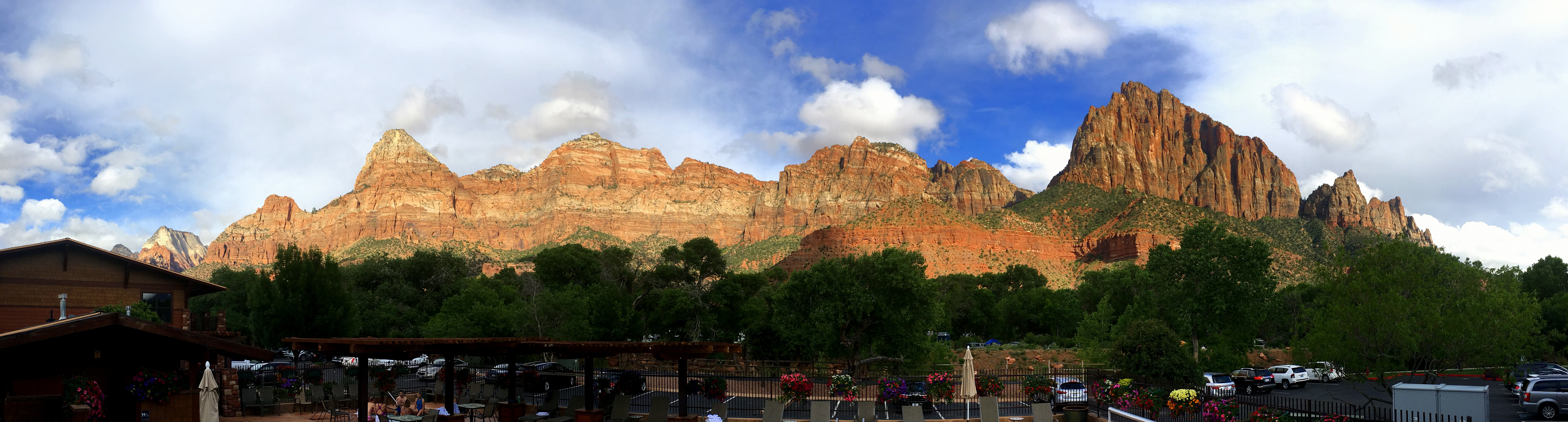
From Springdale, Watchman (right), Bridge Mountain (left)

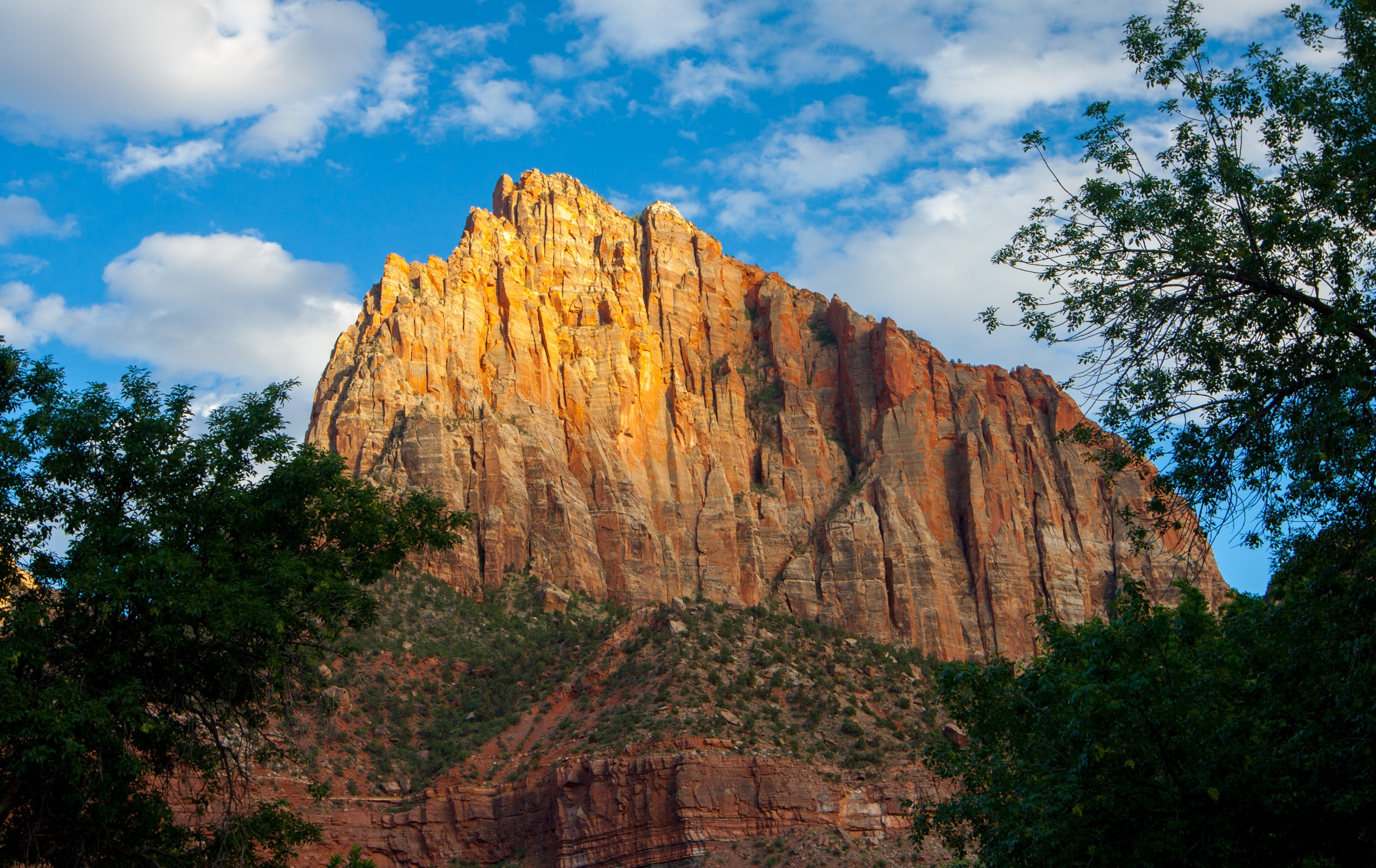
The Watchman at sunset

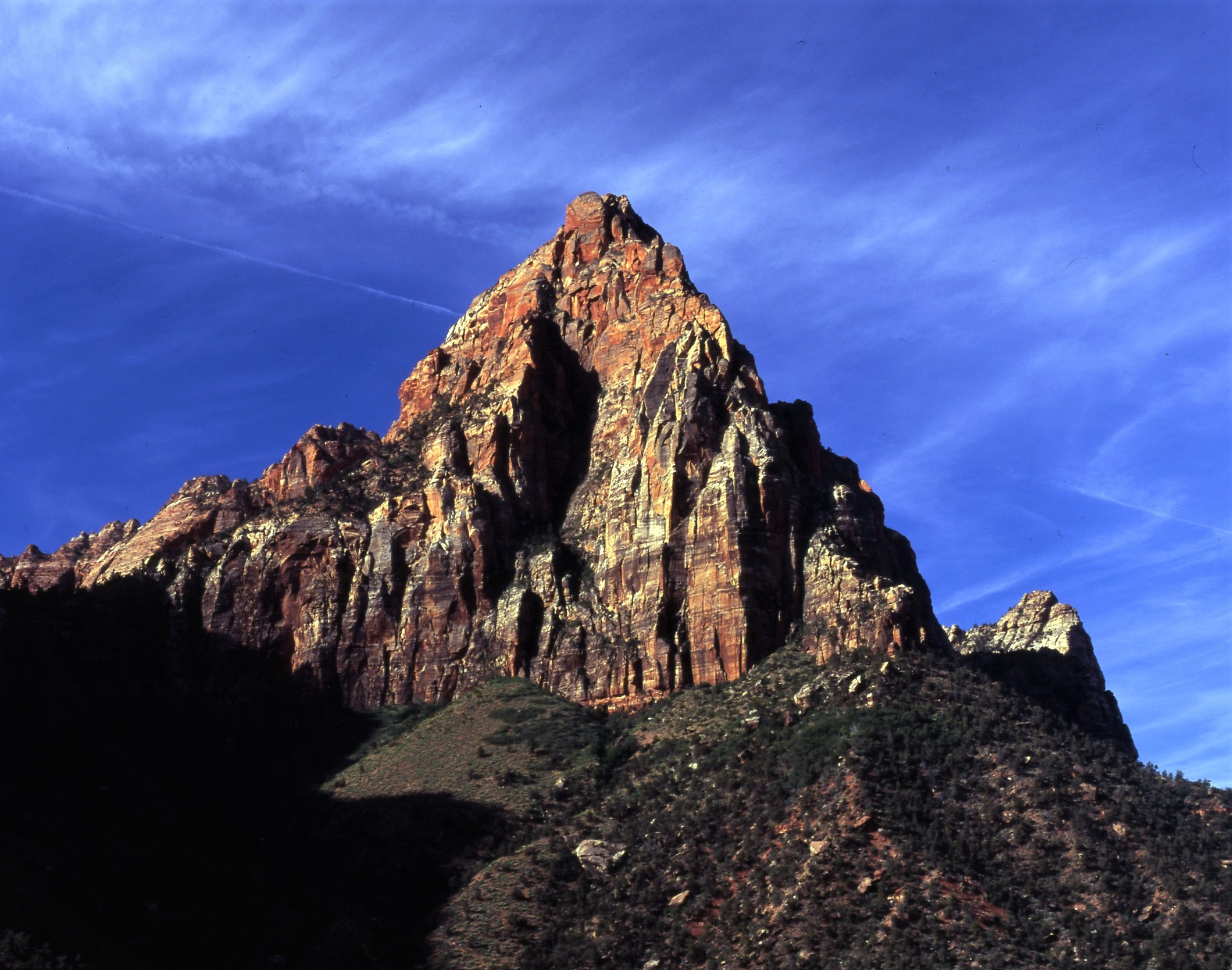

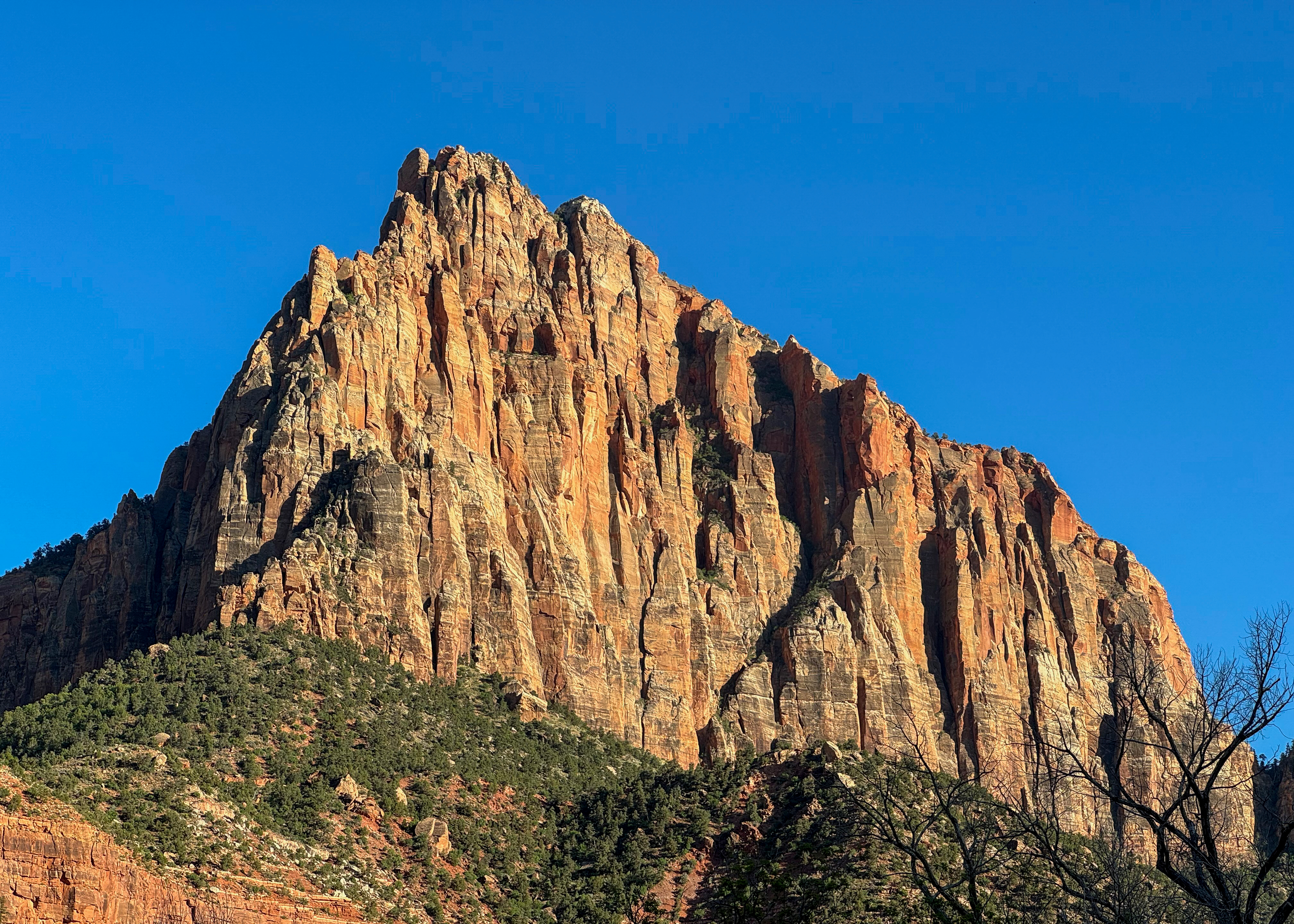

== See also ==
- Geology of the Zion and Kolob canyons area
- Colorado Plateau
