= Jacob Peak =

Mountain in the state of Utah

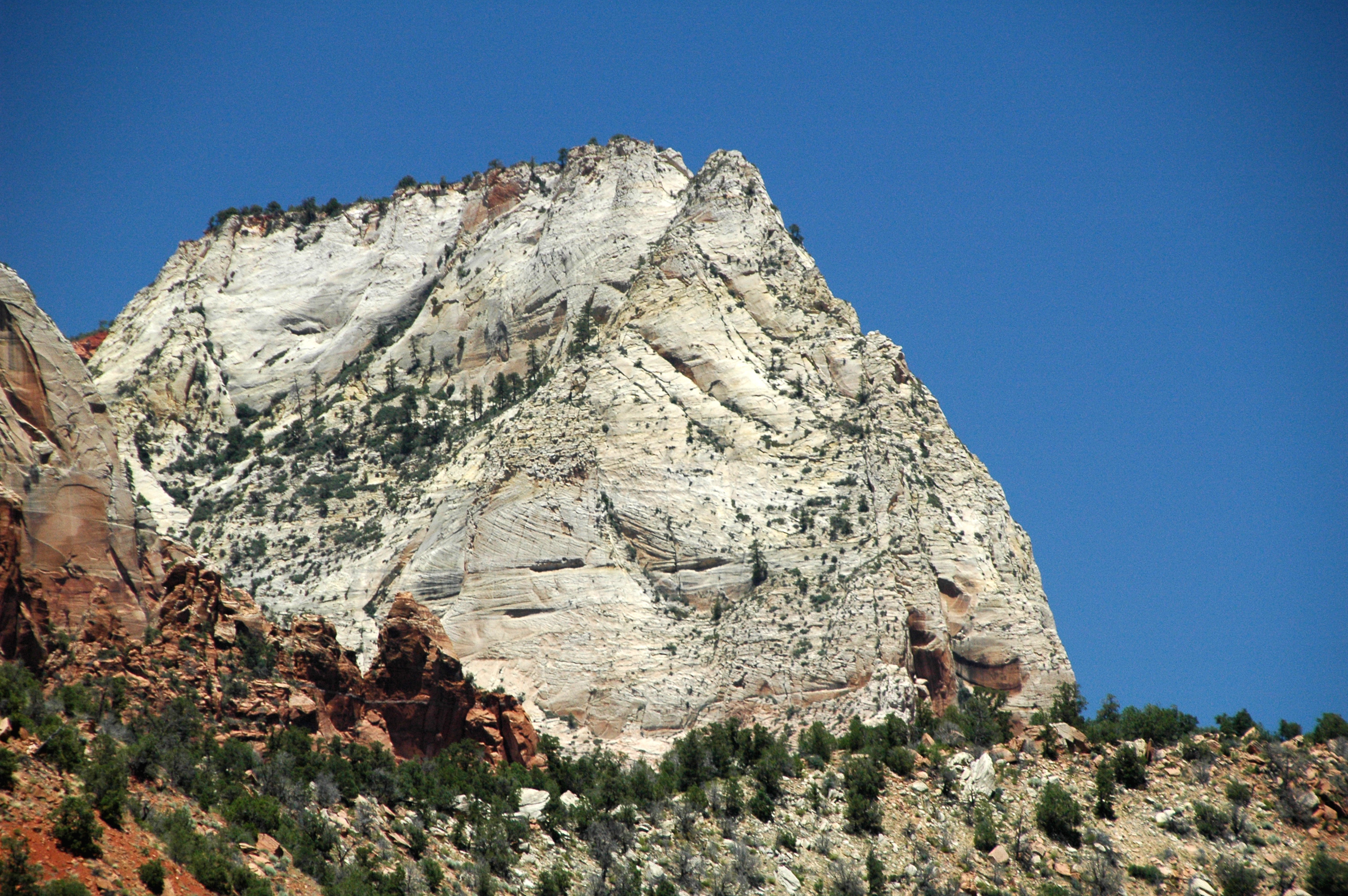

Highest point
- Elevation: 6,873 ft (2,095 m)
- Prominence: 840 ft (260 m)
- Coordinates: 37°14′59.0″N 112°58′30.3″W

Geography
- Location within Utah Location within the United States
- Location: Zion National Park, Washington County, Utah
- Topo map: USGS Springdale East

Geology
- Rock age: Jurassic
- Mountain type: Monolith
- Rock type: Navajo Sandstone

Jacob Peak is a 6,873-foot (2,095 m) rock formation in Zion National Park in Washington County, Utah, United States. Jacob Peak is part of the Three Patriarchs, along with (and located to the north of) Abraham Peak and Isaac Peak.

== Name ==
Zion National Park was first named Mukuntuweap National Monument by Geologist John Wesley Powell. Explorer Frederick Samuel Dellenbaugh, a companion to Powell's, illustrated and wrote about the park in Scribner's Magazine, giving publicity to the region. Shortly afterward, Methodist minister Frederick Vining Fisher explored the park along with two Latter-Day Saints youth and among them named many of the peaks in the park. Along with its neighbor peaks, names were chosen from biblical patriarchs. The name for Isaac Peak was suggested by Claud Hirschi, one of the youth with Fisher and named after Isaac.

== See also ==
- List of mountains of Utah
