= Abraham Peak =

Mountain in the state of Utah

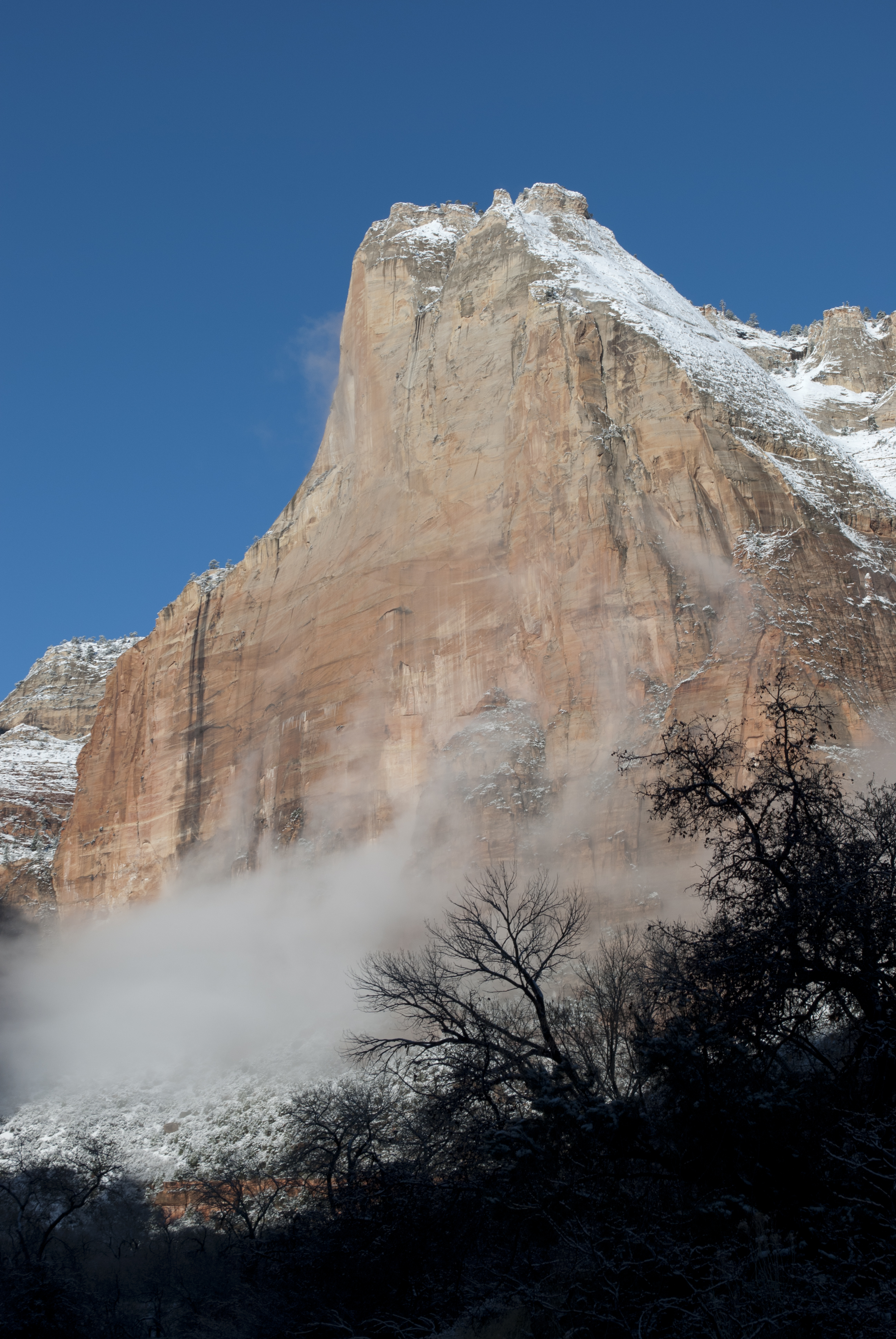
- South face, Abraham Peak

Highest point
- Elevation: 7,015 ft (2,138 m)
- Prominence: 778 ft (237 m)
- Isolation: 0.5 mi (0.80 km)
- Coordinates: 37°14′42.6″N 112°58′53.2″W

Geography
- Location within Utah Location within the United States
- Location: Zion National Park, Washington County, Utah
- Topo map: USGS Springdale East

Geology
- Rock age: Jurassic
- Mountain type: Monolith
- Rock type: Navajo Sandstone

Abraham Peak is a 2,000-foot (610 m) tall rock formation in Zion National Park in Washington County, Utah, United States. Access to Abraham Peak is from the main Park road through Sand Beach Trail. Abraham Peak is the tallest of the three peaks that make the Three Patriarchs. Across from Abraham Peak is prominent The Sentinel (7,120+ ft (2,170+ m), class 5).

== Name ==
Geologist John Wesley Powell named the park Mukuntuweap National Monument, which is now the moniker to the left climbing route of the peak's south face. The name was later changed to Zion in 1918. Explorer Frederick Samuel Dellenbaugh, a companion to Powell's, illustrated and wrote about the park in Scribner's Magazine, giving publicity to the region.

Methodist minister Frederick Vining Fisher explored the park along with two Latter-Day Saints youth in 1916 and among them named many of the peaks in the park. Along with its neighbor peaks, names were chosen from biblical patriarchs. The name of the tallest peak was suggested by Claud Hirschi, one of the youth with Fisher and named after Abraham.

== Climbing routes ==
The south face of Abraham Peak has two rock climbing routes: the Pangea (1,800’, VI class 5.10 A4) on the right side of the face and Munkuntuweap (2,000’, VI class 5.8 A4) on the left. Other routes are variations or neighboring approaches of the Pangea route.

== See also ==
- List of mountains in Utah
- The Watchman (Utah)
- Isaac Peak
