= Bridge Mountain (Utah) =

Mountain in the United States

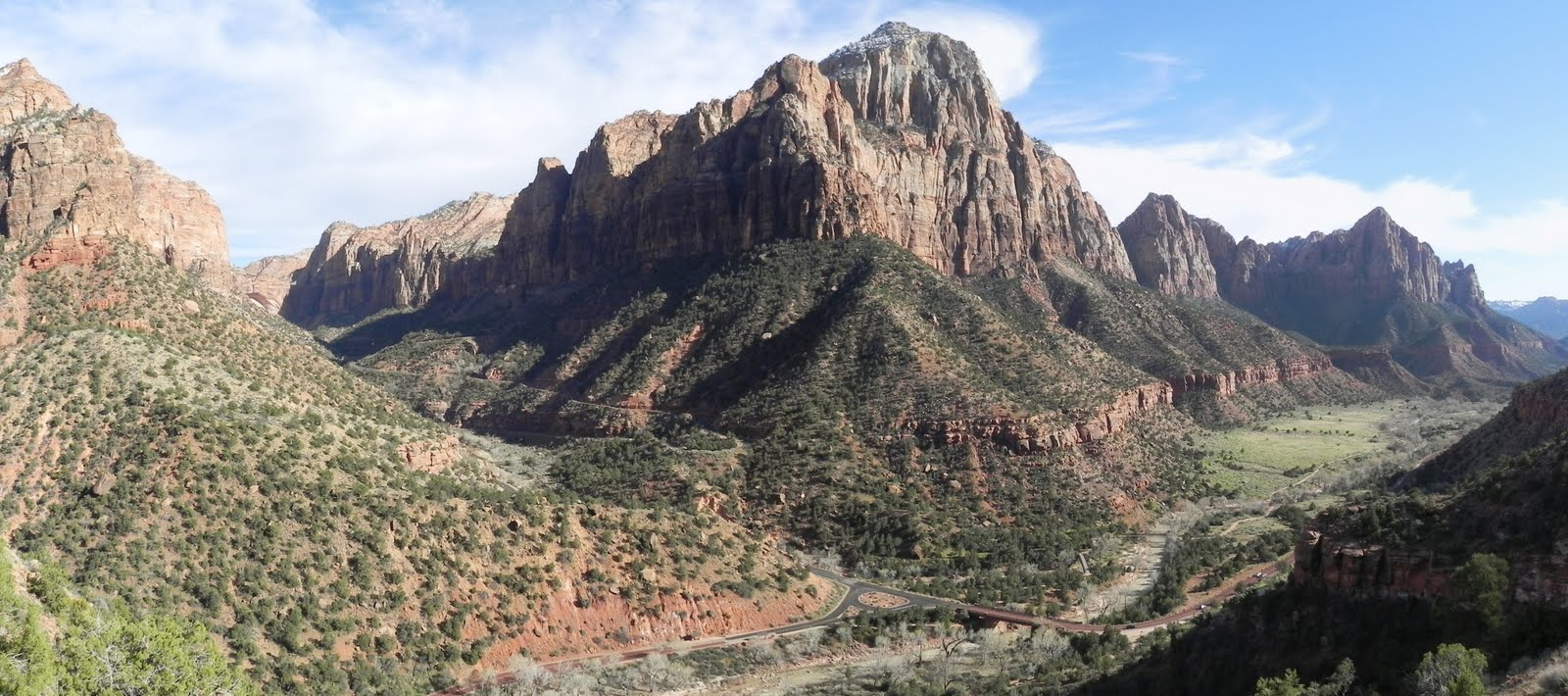
- Bridge Mountain from northwest

Highest point
- Elevation: 6,803 ft (2,074 m)
- Prominence: 1,123 ft (342 m)
- Parent peak: The East Temple (7,709 ft)
- Isolation: 1.32 mi (2.12 km)
- Coordinates: 37°12′22″N 112°57′58″W

Geography
- Location within Utah Location within the United States
- Country: United States
- State: Utah
- County: Washington
- Protected area: Zion National Park
- Parent range: Colorado Plateau
- Topo map: USGS Springdale East

Geology
- Rock type: Navajo sandstone

Climbing
- Easiest route: class 4 scrambling

Bridge Mountain is a 6,803-foot (2,074 m) mountain made of Navajo Sandstone in Zion National Park in Washington County, of southwest Utah, United States.

== Description ==
Bridge Mountain is located east of the park headquarters near the south entrance to Zion Canyon. Bridge Mountain was once originally named Crawford Mountain after the Crawford family who were early Mormon settlers in the canyon. But the name was officially changed to Bridge Mountain in 1934 when a natural bridge was discovered on Bridge Mountain. However, it was not a bridge, but a natural arch. For years, rangers in Zion Park told visitors that this was a natural bridge, hence the mountain's name. A bridge is defined as a subtype of arch that is primarily water-formed. To avoid confusion, the National Park Service eventually named the span Crawford Arch. Precipitation runoff from the mountain drains into tributaries of the North Fork Virgin River. This mountain is composed of Navajo Sandstone, with a red shale outcropping of the Kayenta Formation exposed along the lower slopes.

== Climate ==
Spring and fall are the most favorable seasons to visit Bridge Mountain. According to the Köppen climate classification system, it is located in a Cold semi-arid climate zone, which is defined by the coldest month having an average mean temperature below 32 °F (0 °C), and at least 50% of the total annual precipitation being received during the spring and summer. This desert climate receives less than 10 inches (250 millimeters) of annual rainfall, and snowfall is generally light during the winter.

== Gallery ==
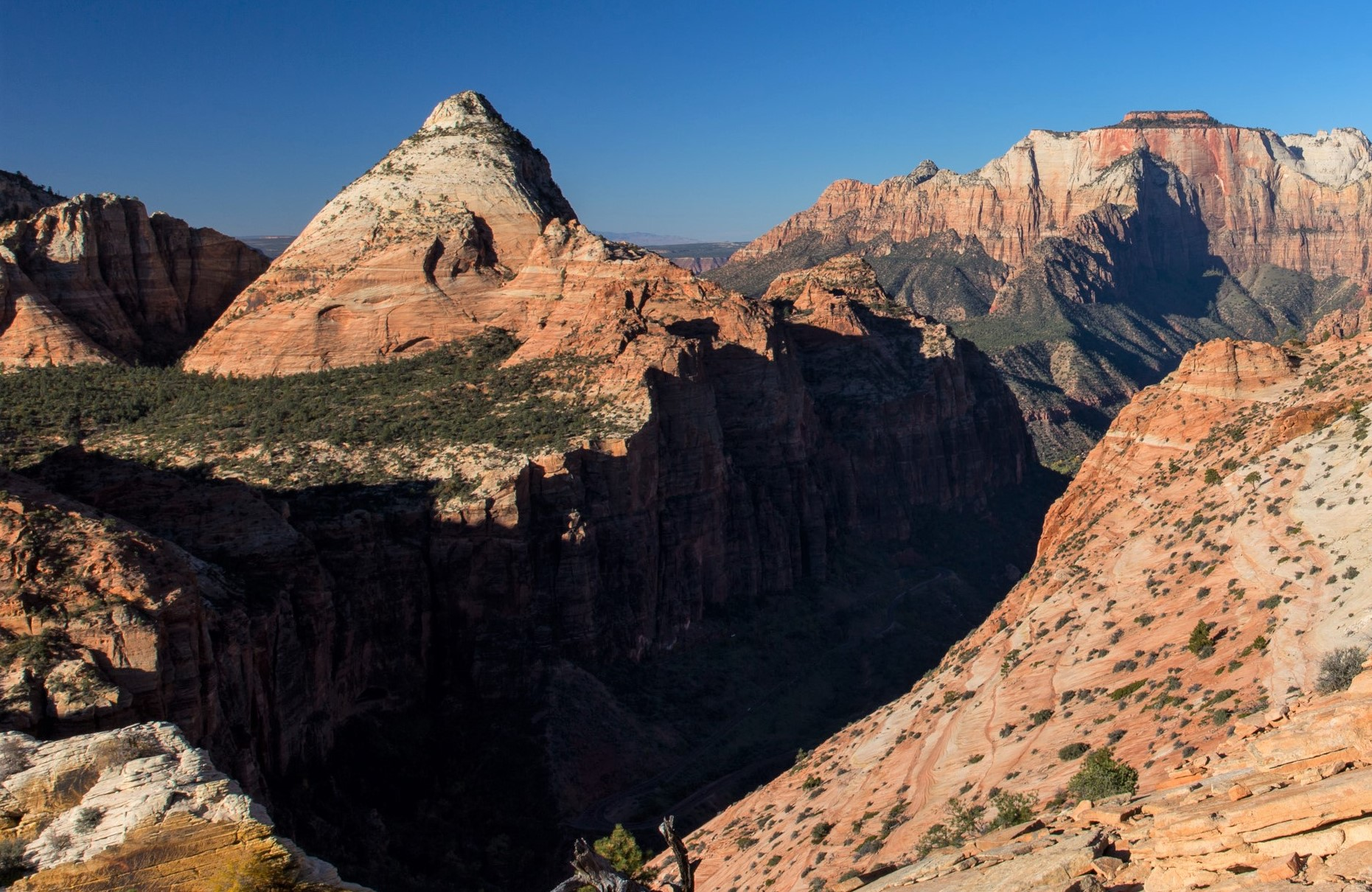
Bridge Mountain (left) and The West Temple seen from the east

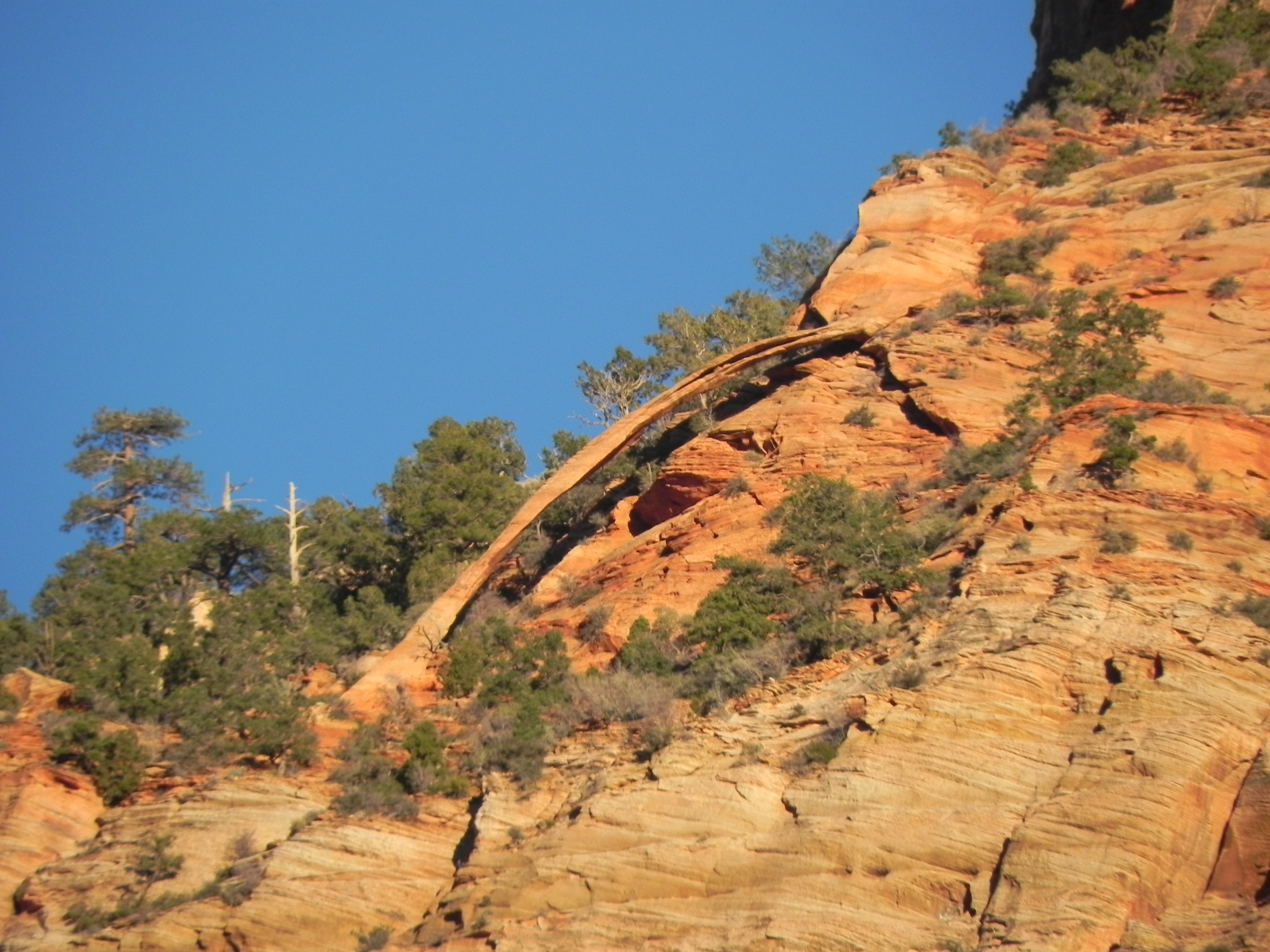
Crawford Arch on Bridge Mountain

== See also ==
- Geology of the Zion and Kolob canyons area
- Colorado Plateau
