= Deertrap Mountain =

Mountain in Washington County, Utah

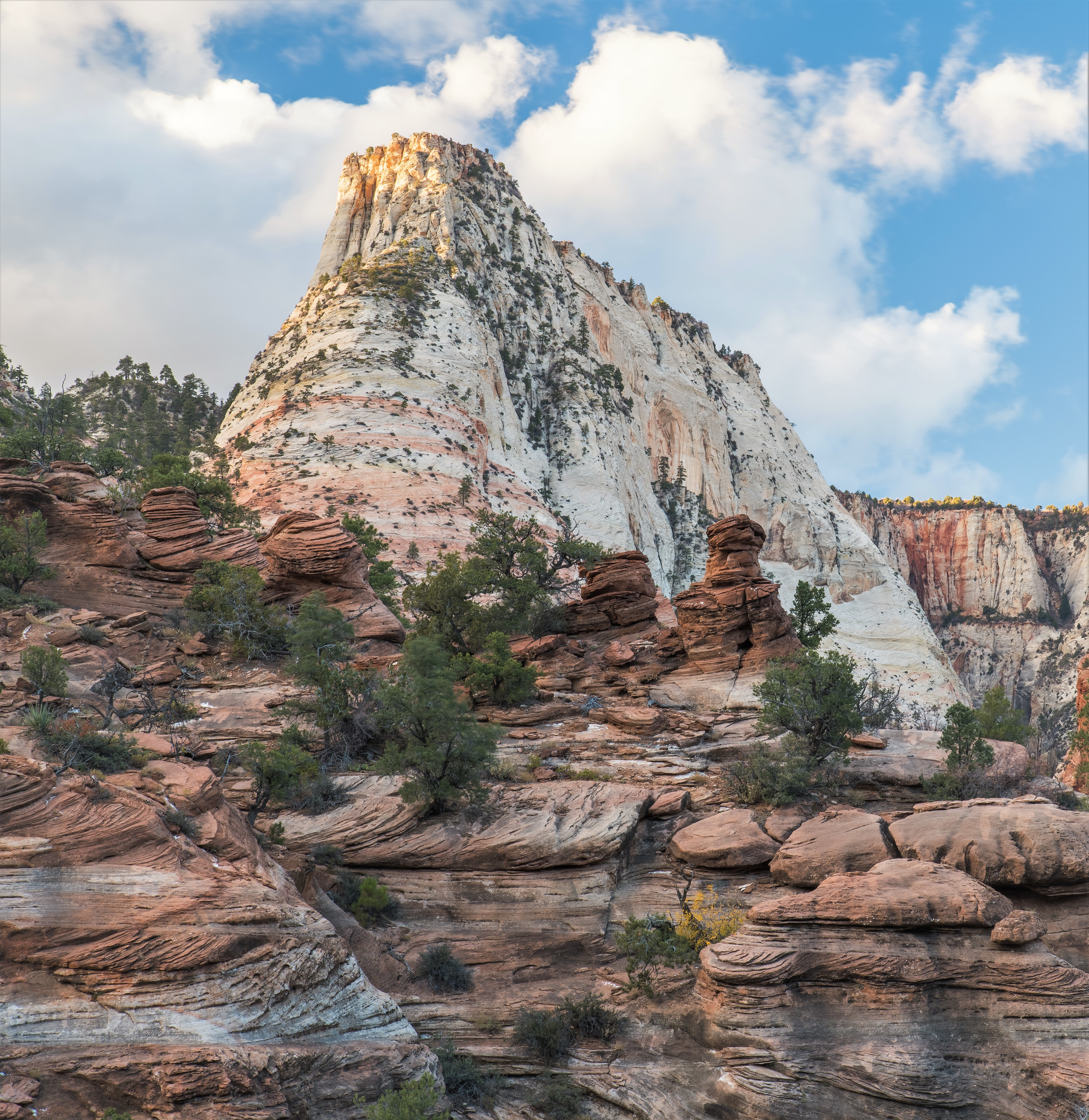
- South aspect, from Zion – Mount Carmel Highway

Highest point
- Elevation: 6,837 ft (2,084 m)
- Prominence: 80 ft (24 m)
- Parent peak: Twin Brothers (6,863 ft)
- Isolation: 0.68 mi (1.09 km)
- Coordinates: 37°14′08″N 112°56′39″W

Geography
- Location within Utah Location within the United States
- Country: United States
- State: Utah
- County: Washington
- Protected area: Zion National Park
- Parent range: Colorado Plateau
- Topo map: USGS Springdale East

Geology
- Rock age: Jurassic
- Rock type: Navajo sandstone

Climbing
- Easiest route: Hiking class 1 Trail

Deertrap Mountain is a 6,837-foot (2,084 m) mountain in Zion National Park in Washington County, Utah, United States.

== Description ==
Deertrap Mountain is composed of white Navajo Sandstone and set on the east rim of Zion Canyon. It is situated one mile southeast of Zion Lodge, and three miles northeast of park headquarters. The nearest neighbor is Mountain of the Sun, one-half mile to the west, and the nearest higher peak is Twin Brothers, 0.68 miles (1.09 km) to the southwest. The East Temple is situated 1.1 mile to the south-southwest, and Ant Hill is set 1.4 miles (2.3 km) to the southeast. Pine Creek originates at Deertrap, and the North Fork of the Virgin River drains precipitation runoff from this mountain. This feature's name was officially adopted April 4, 1934, by the U.S. Board on Geographic Names. It is believed that the Paiute drove mule deer onto the mesa here, trapping them for food.

== Climate ==
Spring and fall are the most favorable seasons to visit Deertrap Mountain. According to the Köppen climate classification system, it is located in a Cold semi-arid climate zone, which is defined by the coldest month having an average mean temperature below 32 °F (0 °C), and at least 50% of the total annual precipitation being received during the spring and summer. This desert climate receives less than 10 inches (250 millimeters) of annual rainfall, and snowfall is generally light during the winter.

== See also ==
- List of mountains of Utah
- Geology of the Zion and Kolob canyons area
- Colorado Plateau
