= Mountain of the Sun =

Mountain in the state of Utah

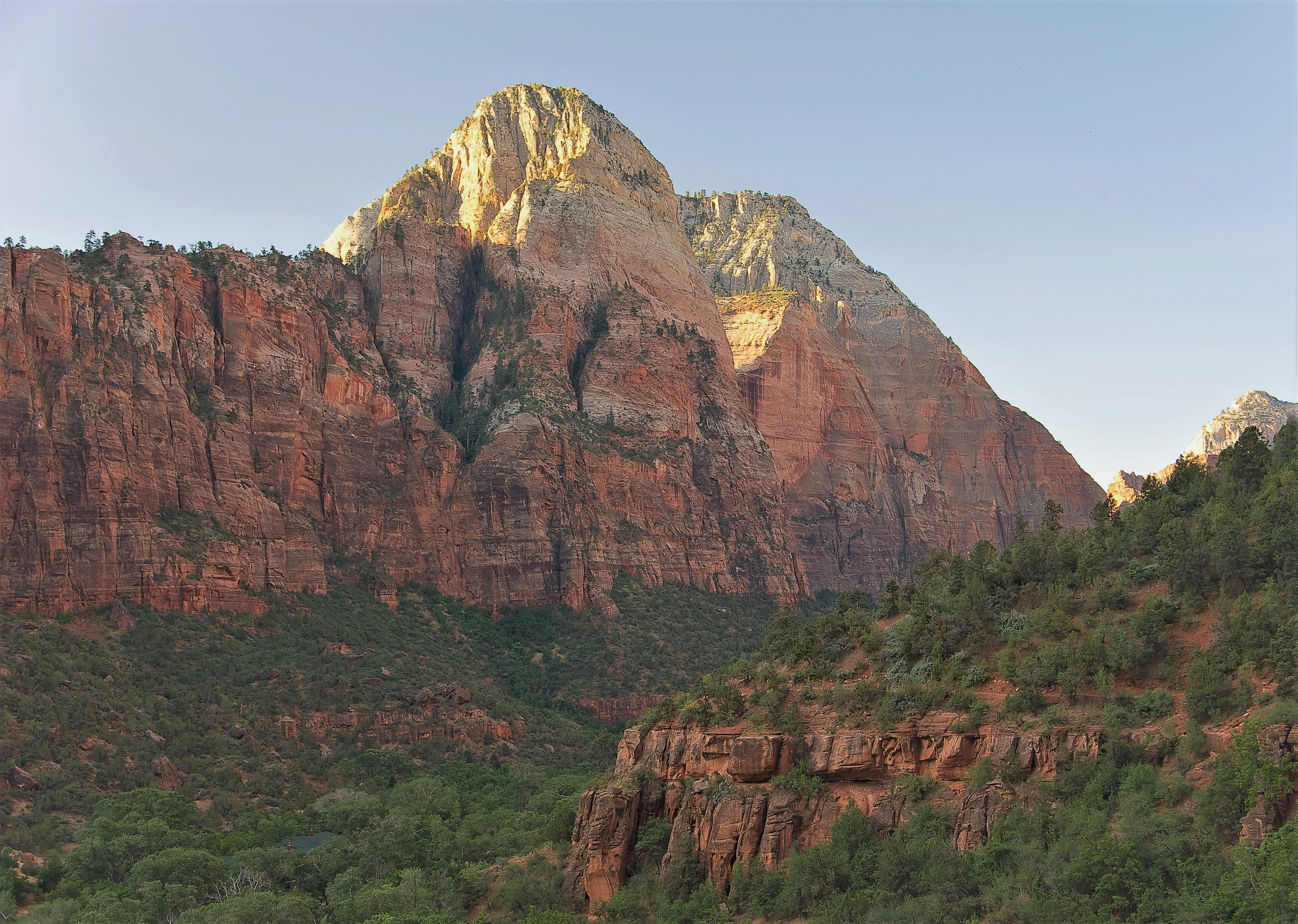

Highest point
- Elevation: 6,722 ft (2,049 m)
- Prominence: 842 ft (257 m)
- Parent peak: Twin Brothers (6,863 ft)
- Isolation: 0.46 mi (0.74 km)
- Coordinates: 37°14′06″N 112°57′12″W

Geography
- Location within Utah Location within the United States
- Country: United States
- State: Utah
- County: Washington
- Protected area: Zion National Park
- Parent range: Colorado Plateau
- Topo map: USGS Springdale East

Geology
- Rock age: Jurassic
- Rock type: Navajo sandstone

Climbing
- Easiest route: class 4+ climbing

Mountain of the Sun is a 6,722-foot (2,049 m) elevation Navajo Sandstone summit located in Zion National Park, in Washington County of southwest Utah, United States. Mountain of the Sun is situated immediately east of Court of the Patriarchs, and south of Zion Lodge, towering 2,500 feet (760 meters) above the lodge and the floor of Zion Canyon. It is set on the east side of the North Fork of the Virgin River which drains precipitation runoff from this mountain. Its neighbors include The Sentinel, Mount Spry, The East Temple, and Mount Moroni. This feature's name was officially adopted in 1934 by the U.S. Board on Geographic Names.

== Climate ==
Spring and fall are the most favorable seasons to visit Mountain of the Sun. According to the Köppen climate classification system, it is located in a Cold semi-arid climate zone, which is defined by the coldest month having an average mean temperature below 32 °F (0 °C), and at least 50% of the total annual precipitation being received during the spring and summer. This desert climate receives less than 10 inches (250 millimeters) of annual rainfall, and snowfall is generally light during the winter.

== Gallery ==
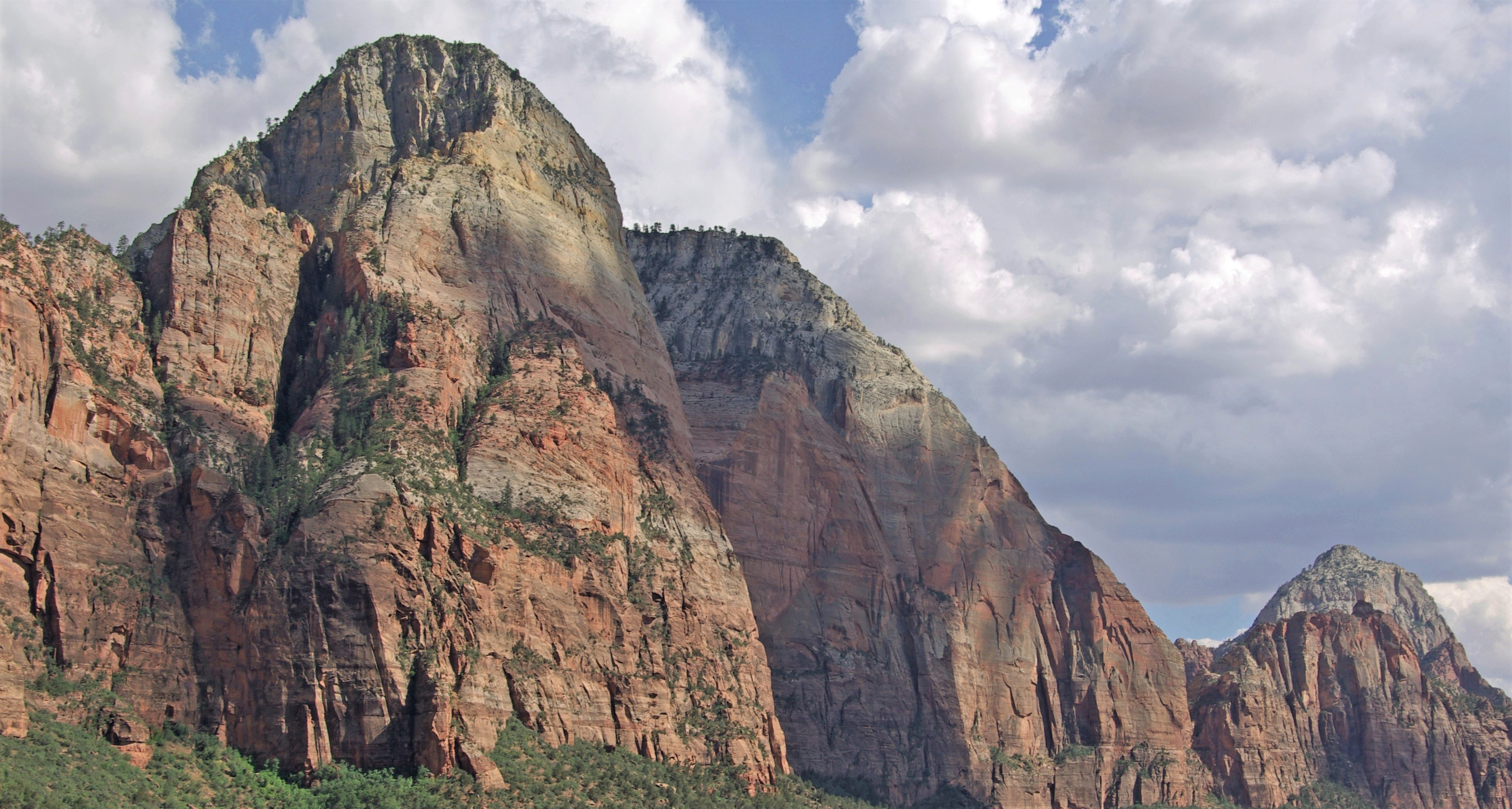
Mountain of the Sun (left) covering Twin Brothers (center), as seen from the north

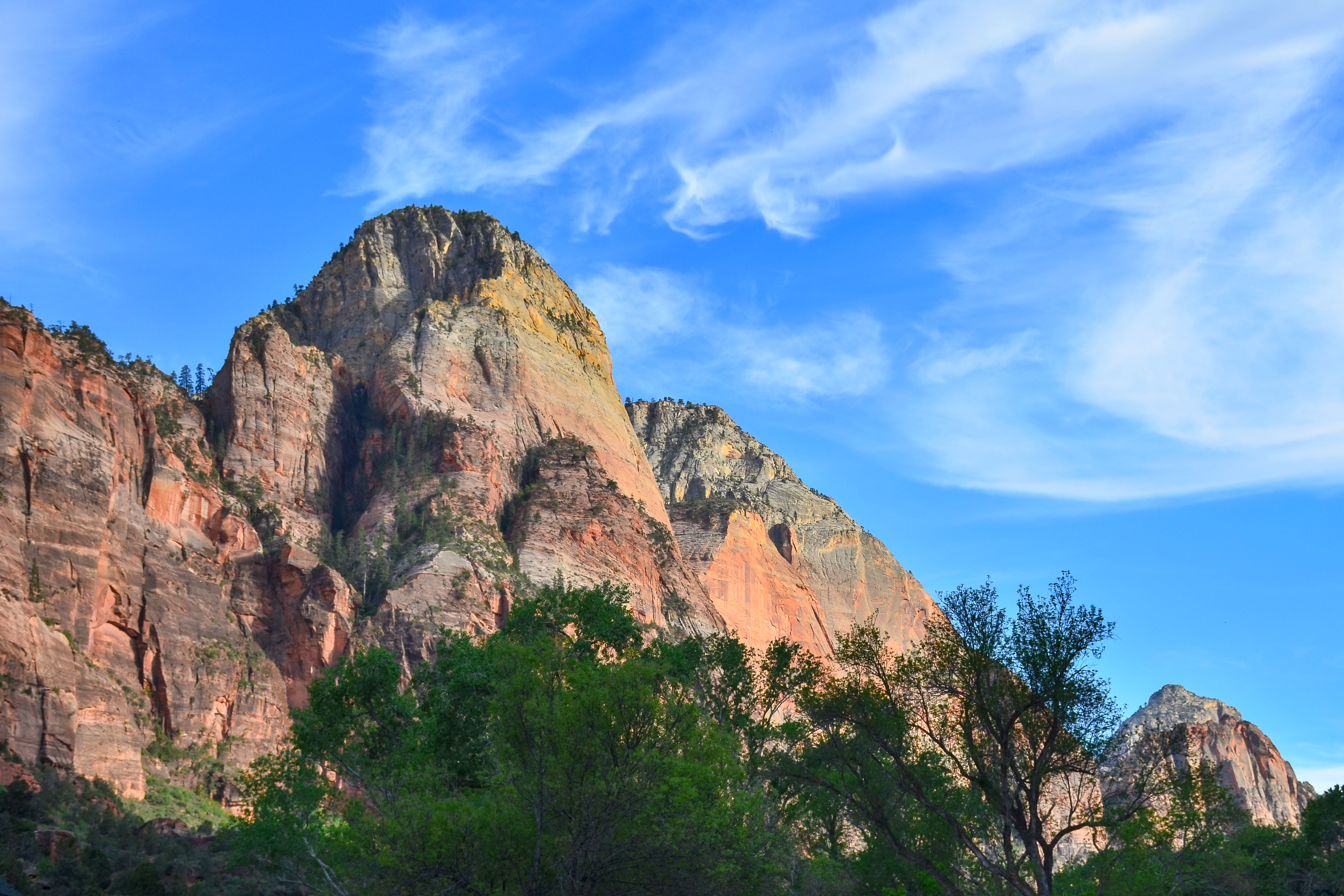
from Zion Lodge

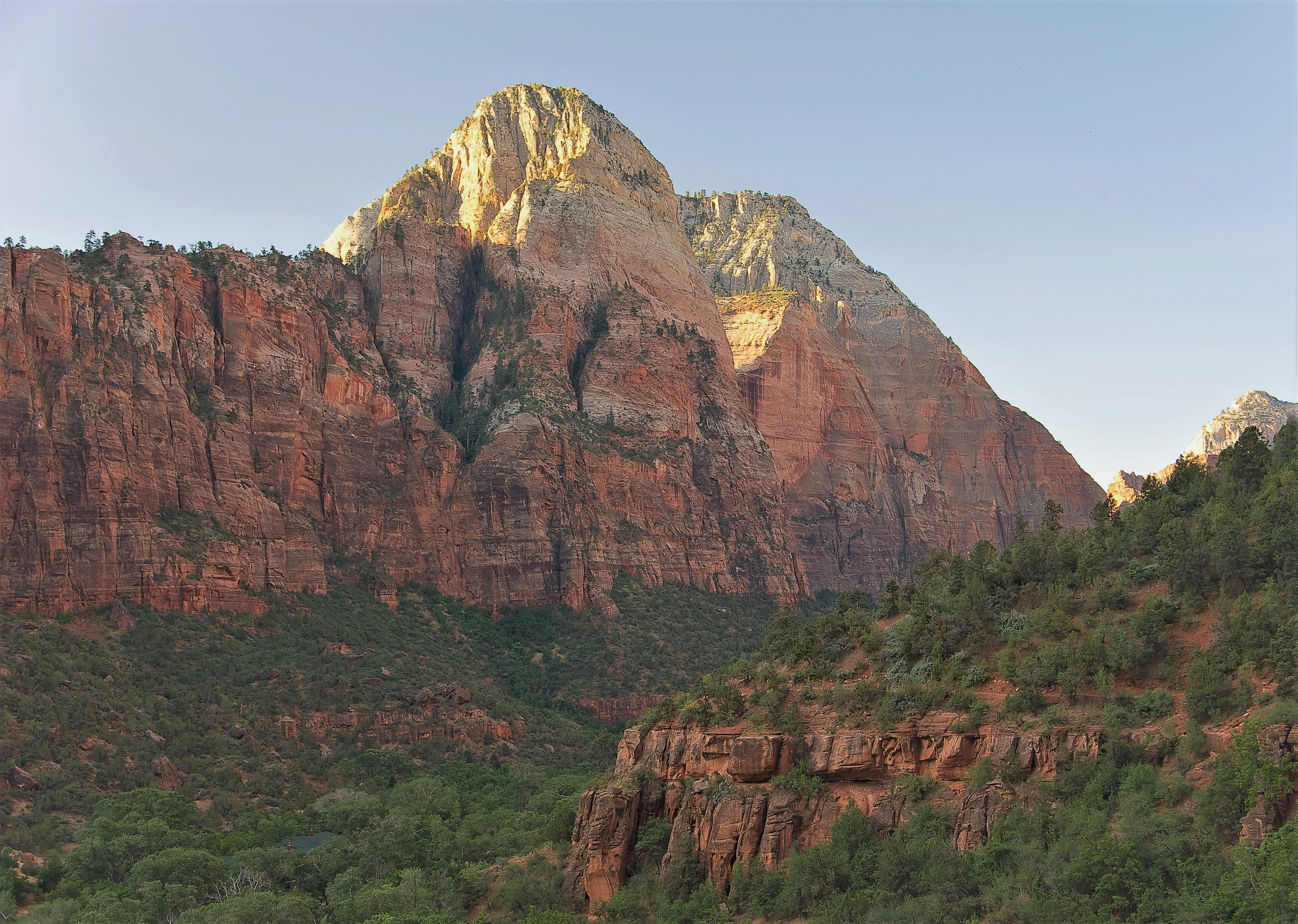

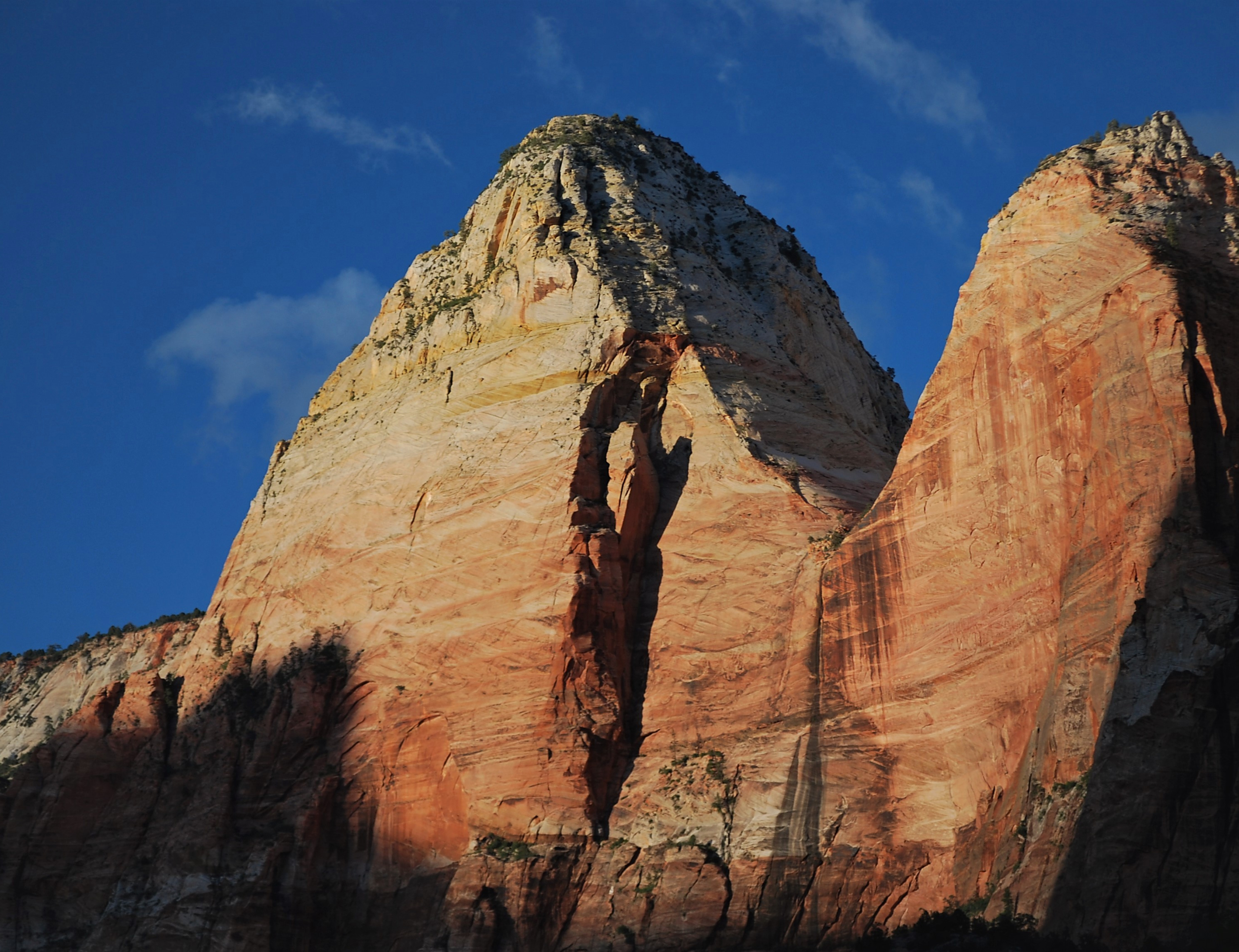
From the southwest

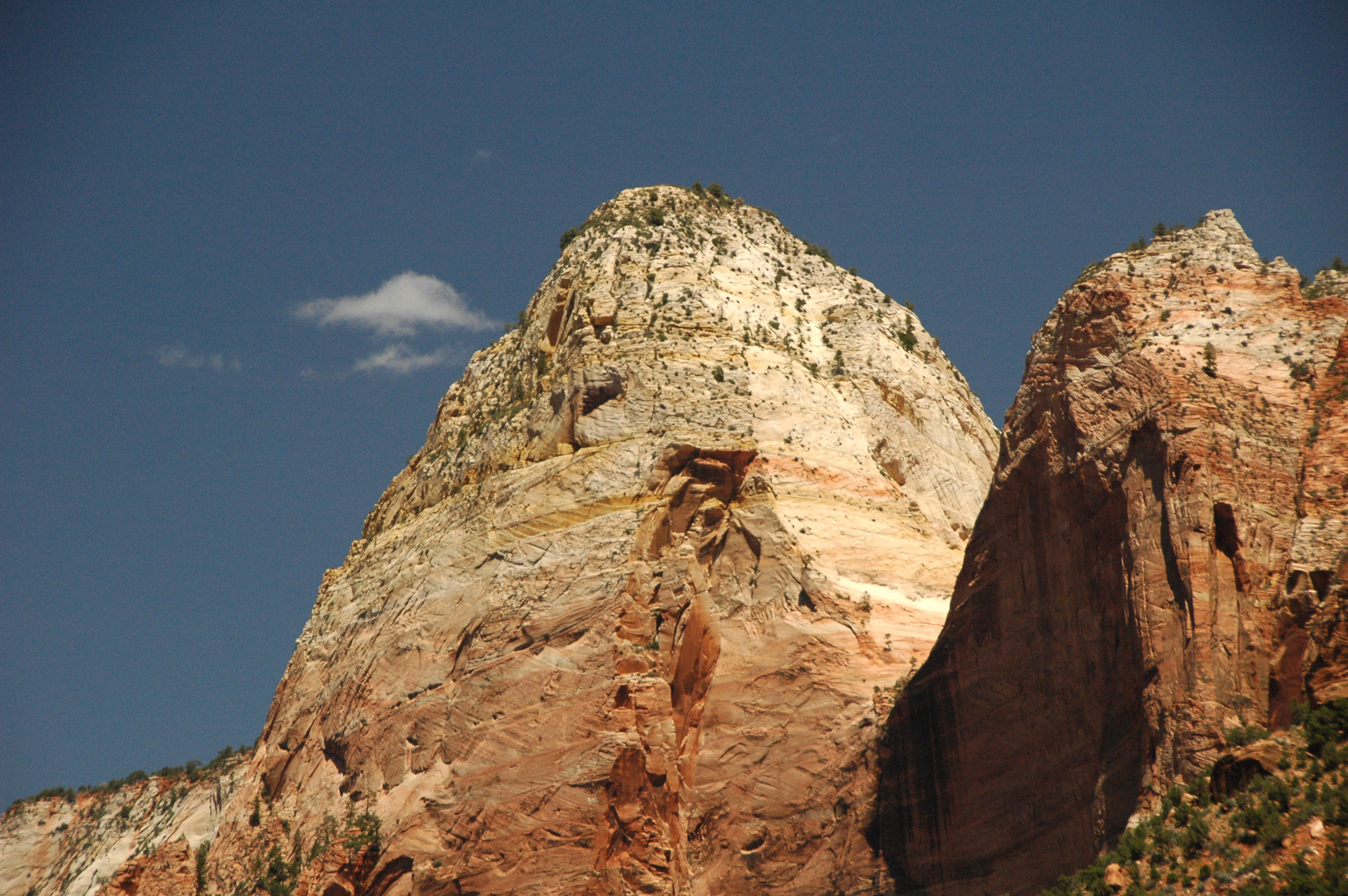
From the southwest

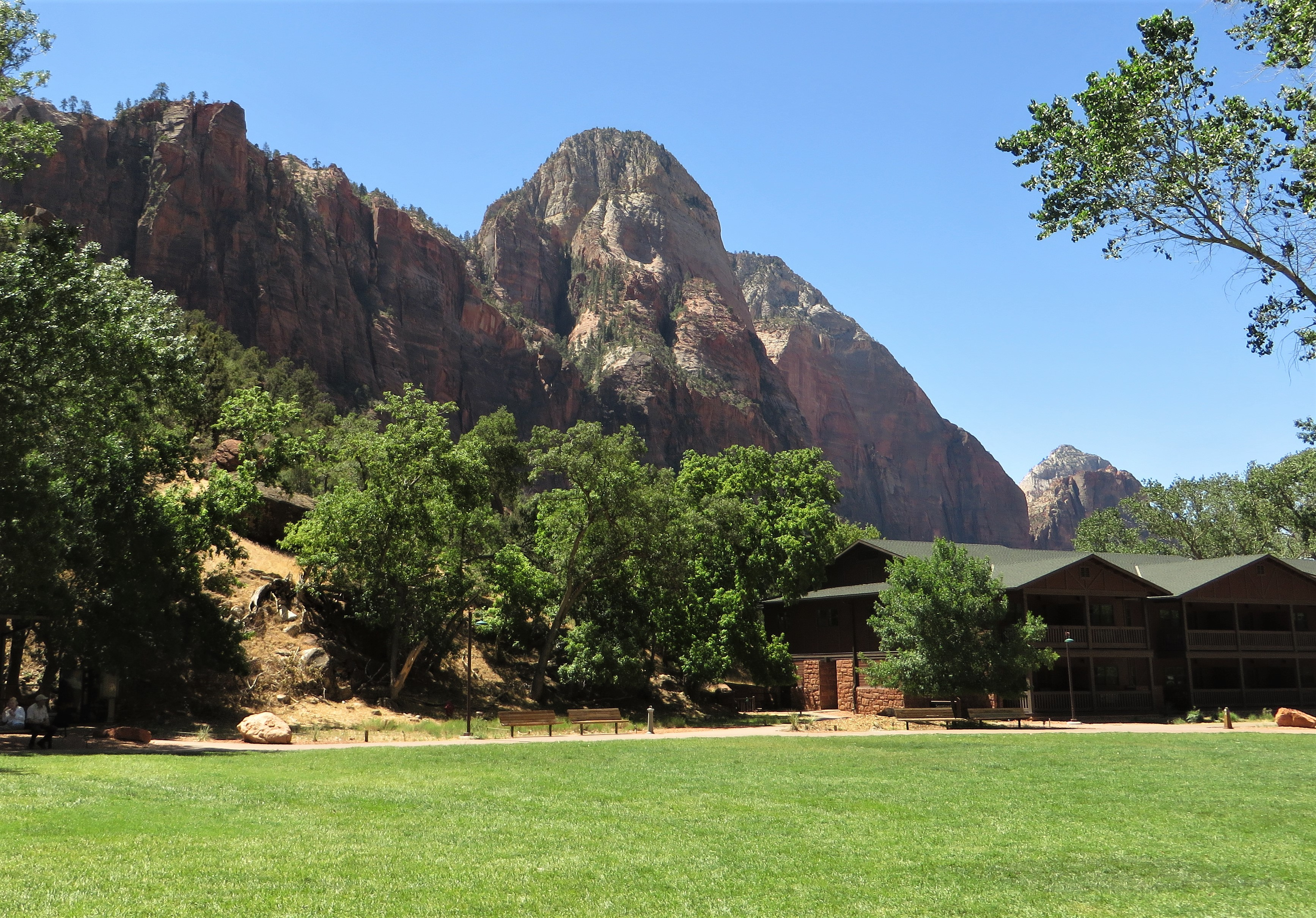
Zion Lodge and Mountain of the Sun

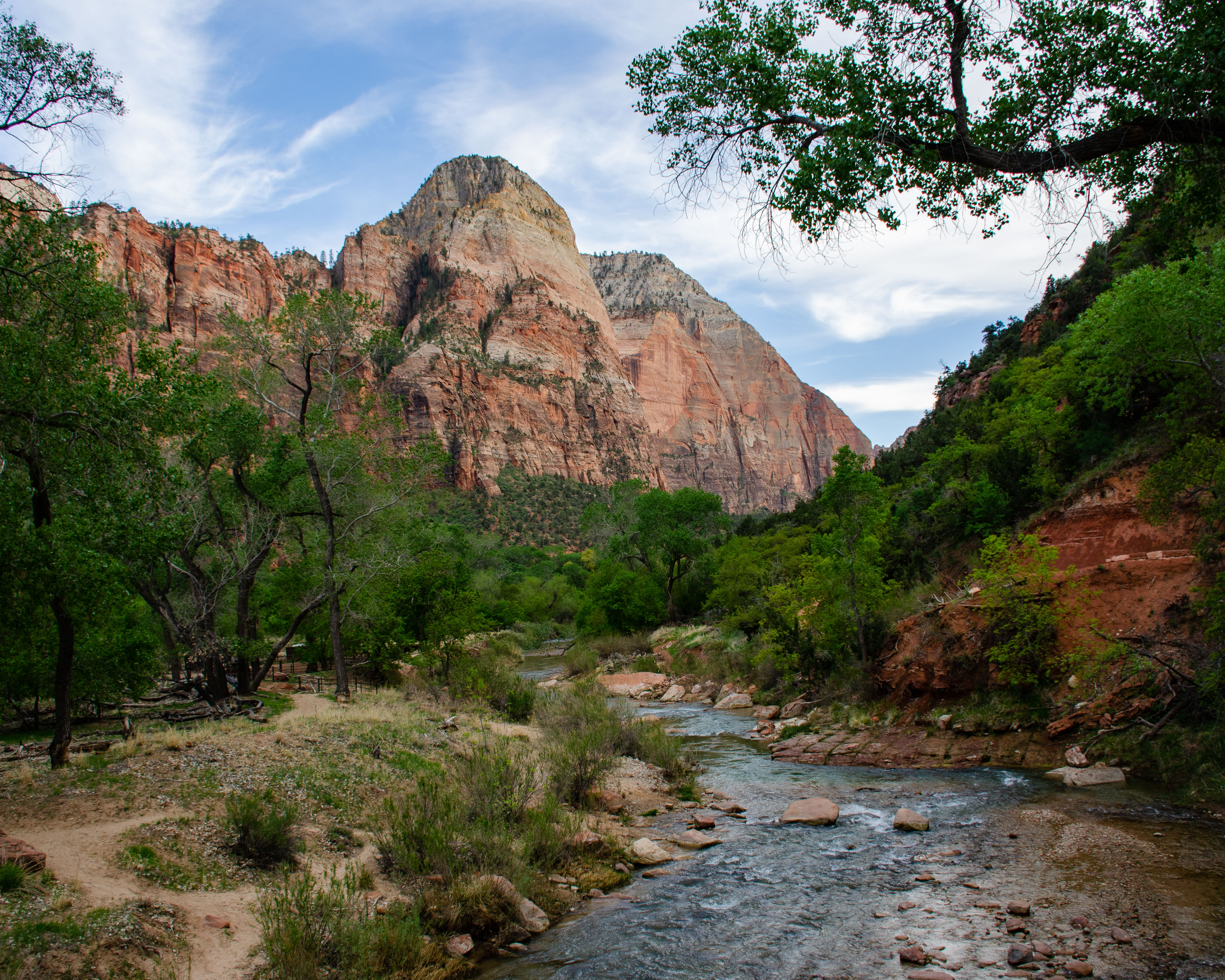
North aspect, with Virgin River

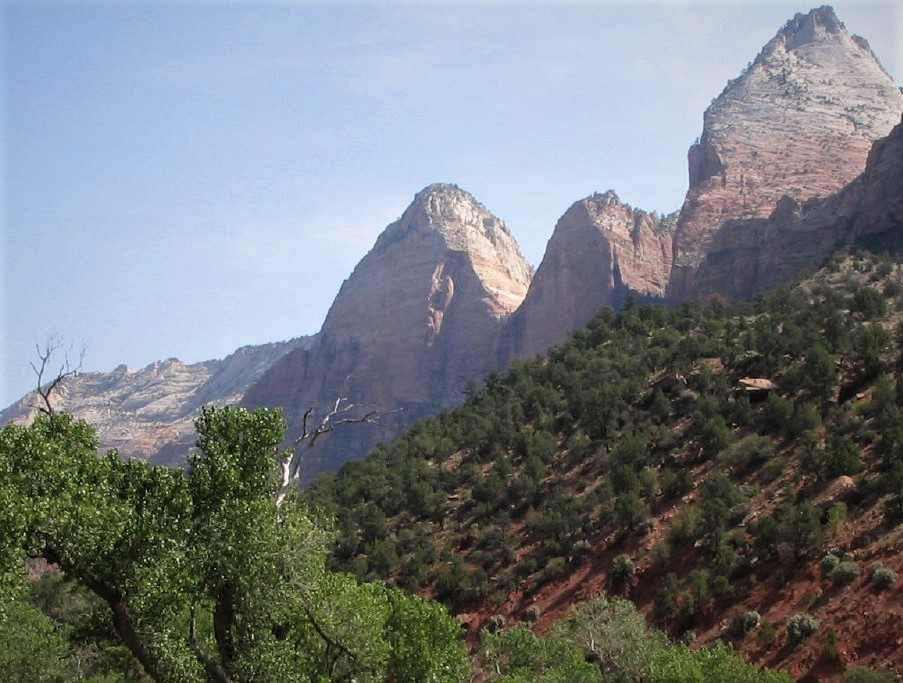
Mountain of the Sun (centered) seen from SW with Twin Brothers (right)

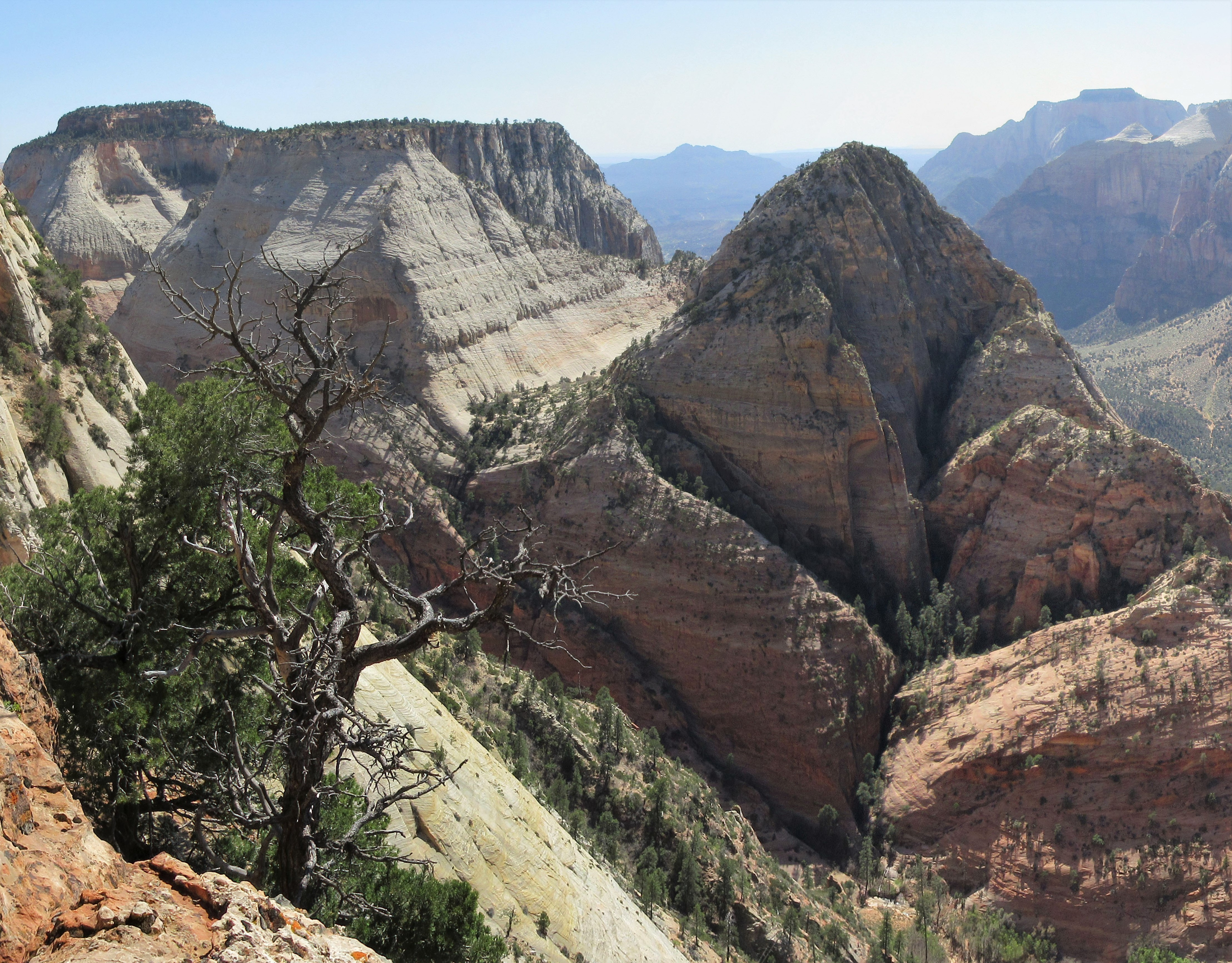
The East Temple, Twin Brothers, Mountain of the Sun (right of center) seen from the northeast on Deertrap Mountain

== See also ==
- List of mountains in Utah
- Geology of the Zion and Kolob canyons area
- Colorado Plateau
