= Twin Brothers =

Mountain in the state of Utah

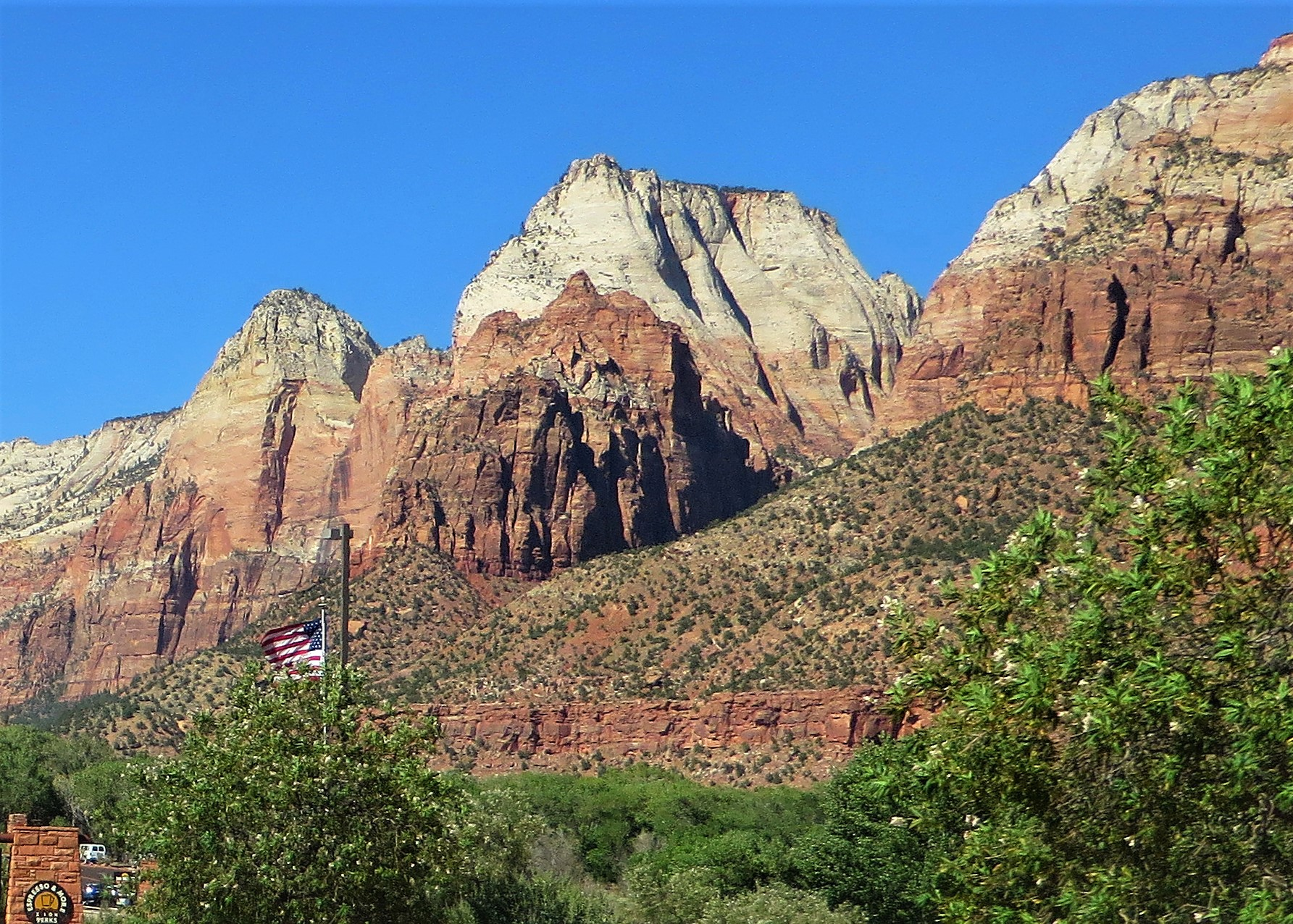
- Southwest aspect centered, viewed from Springdale

Highest point
- Elevation: 6,863 ft (2,092 m)
- Prominence: 1,023 ft (312 m)
- Parent peak: The East Temple (7,709 ft)
- Isolation: 0.51 mi (0.82 km)
- Coordinates: 37°13′41″N 112°57′08″W

Geography
- Location within Utah Location within the United States
- Country: United States
- State: Utah
- County: Washington
- Protected area: Zion National Park
- Parent range: Colorado Plateau
- Topo map: USGS Springdale East

Geology
- Rock age: Jurassic
- Rock type: Navajo sandstone

Climbing
- First ascent: 1966
- Easiest route: class 5.3 climbing

Twin Brothers is a 6,863-foot (2,092 m) Navajo Sandstone mountain in Zion National Park in Washington County, Utah, United States.

== Description ==
Twin Brothers is situated one-half mile (0.80 km) immediately north of The East Temple, and one-half mile (0.80 km) immediately south of Mountain of the Sun, towering 2,800 feet (850 m) above the floor of Zion Canyon. It is set on the east side of the North Fork of the Virgin River which drains precipitation runoff from this mountain. Its neighbors across the canyon include Bee Hive, The Sentinel, and Mount Moroni. Mount Spry, set southwest and below Twin Brothers, often appears in photos taken of both from park headquarters. This feature's name was officially adopted in 1934 by the U.S. Board on Geographic Names.

== Climate ==
Spring and fall are the most favorable seasons to visit Twin Brothers. According to the Köppen climate classification system, it is located in a Cold semi-arid climate zone, which is defined by the coldest month having an average mean temperature below 32 °F (0 °C), and at least 50% of the total annual precipitation being received during the spring and summer. This desert climate receives less than 10 inches (250 millimeters) of annual rainfall, and snowfall is generally light during the winter.

== Gallery ==
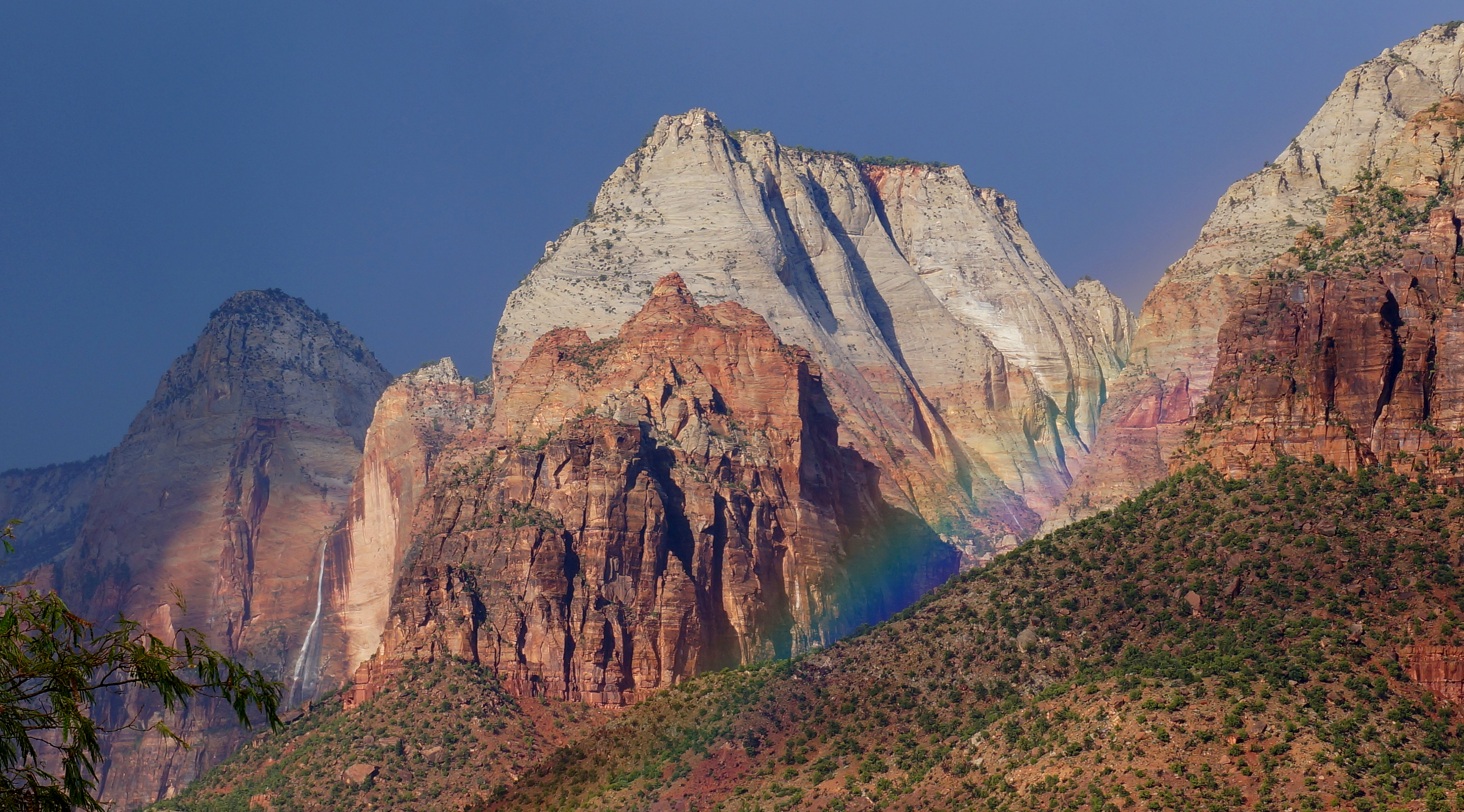
Twin Brothers after storm

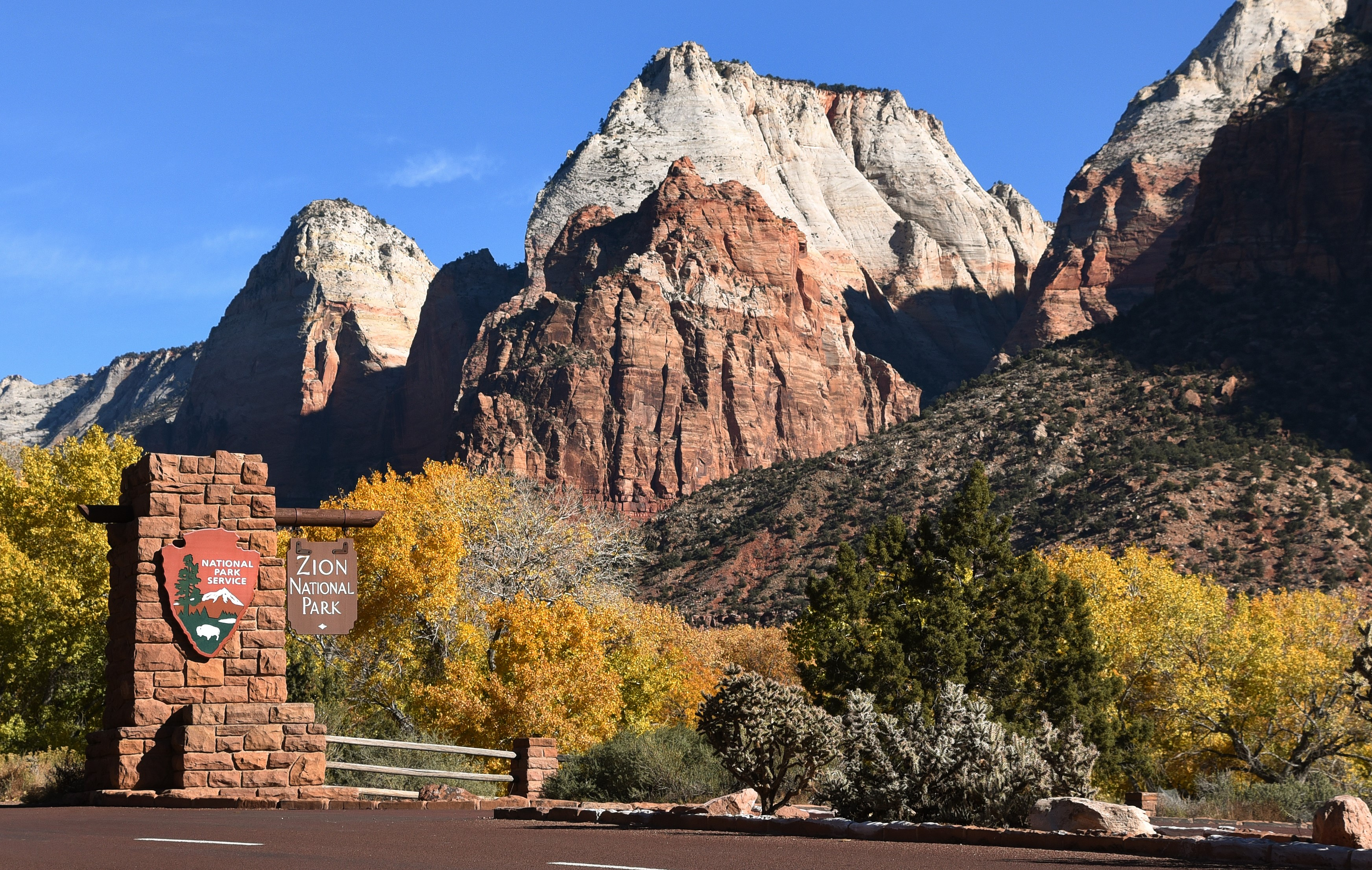

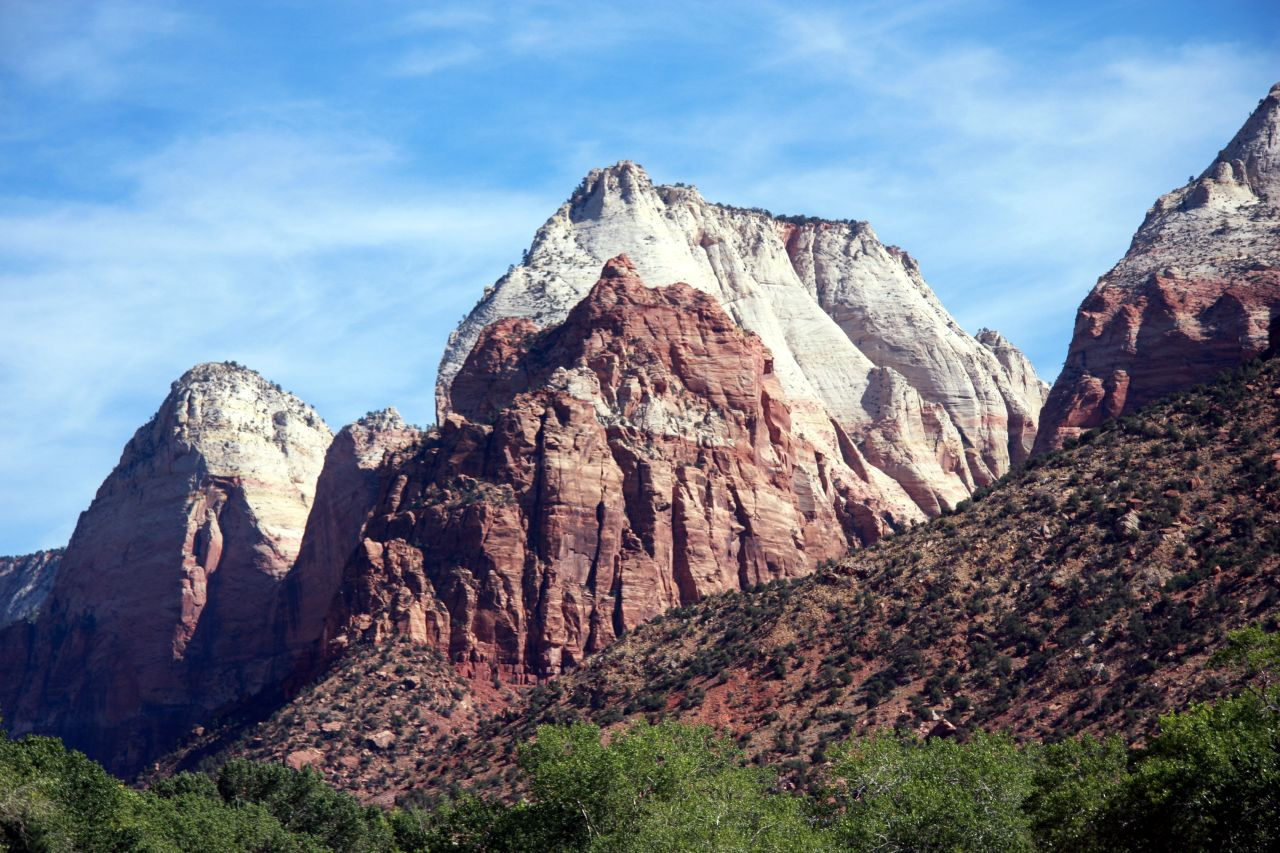
Twin Brothers behind reddish Mt. Spry, with Mountain of the Sun to left

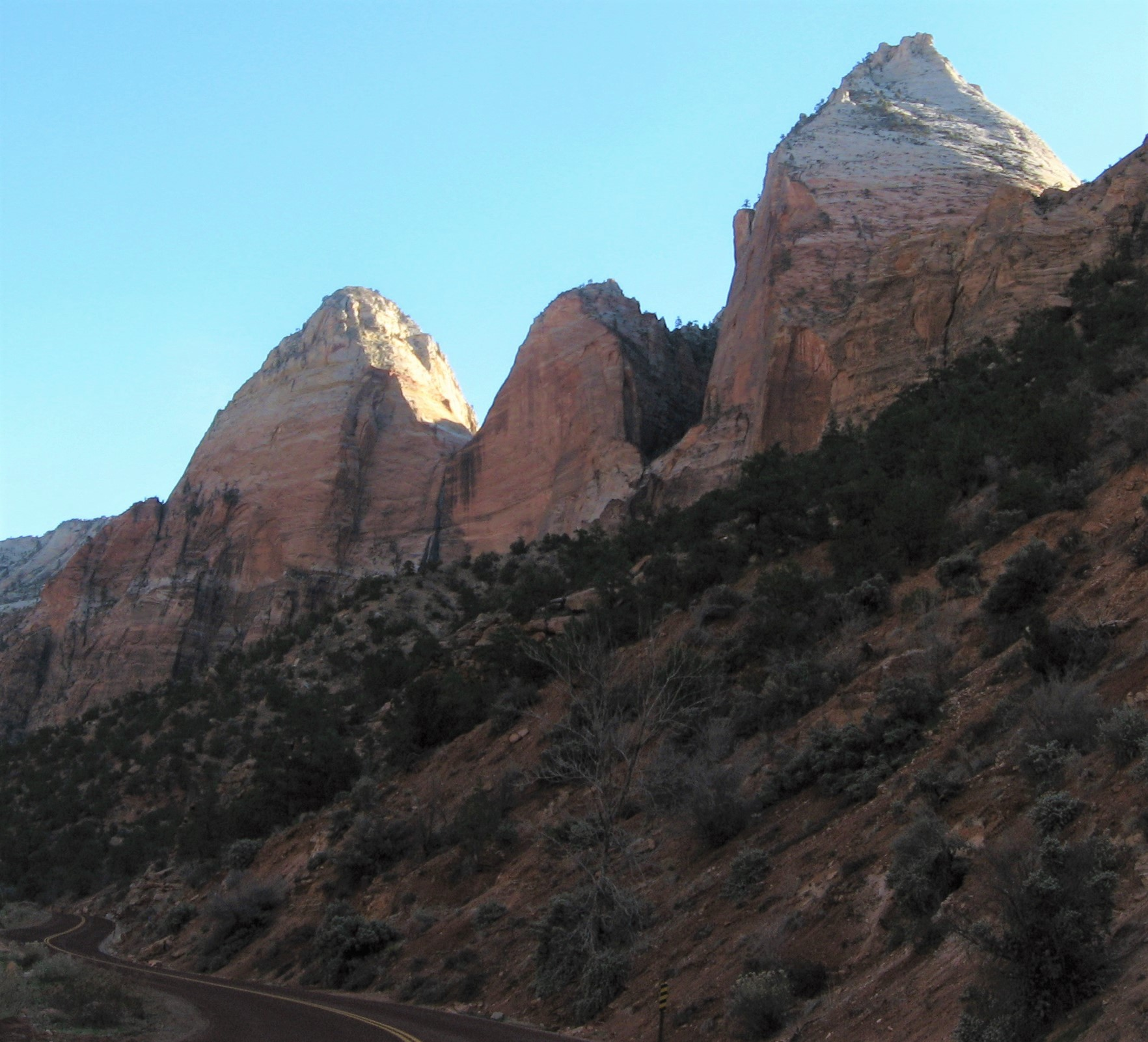
Mountain of the Sun (left) seen from SW with Twin Brothers (right)

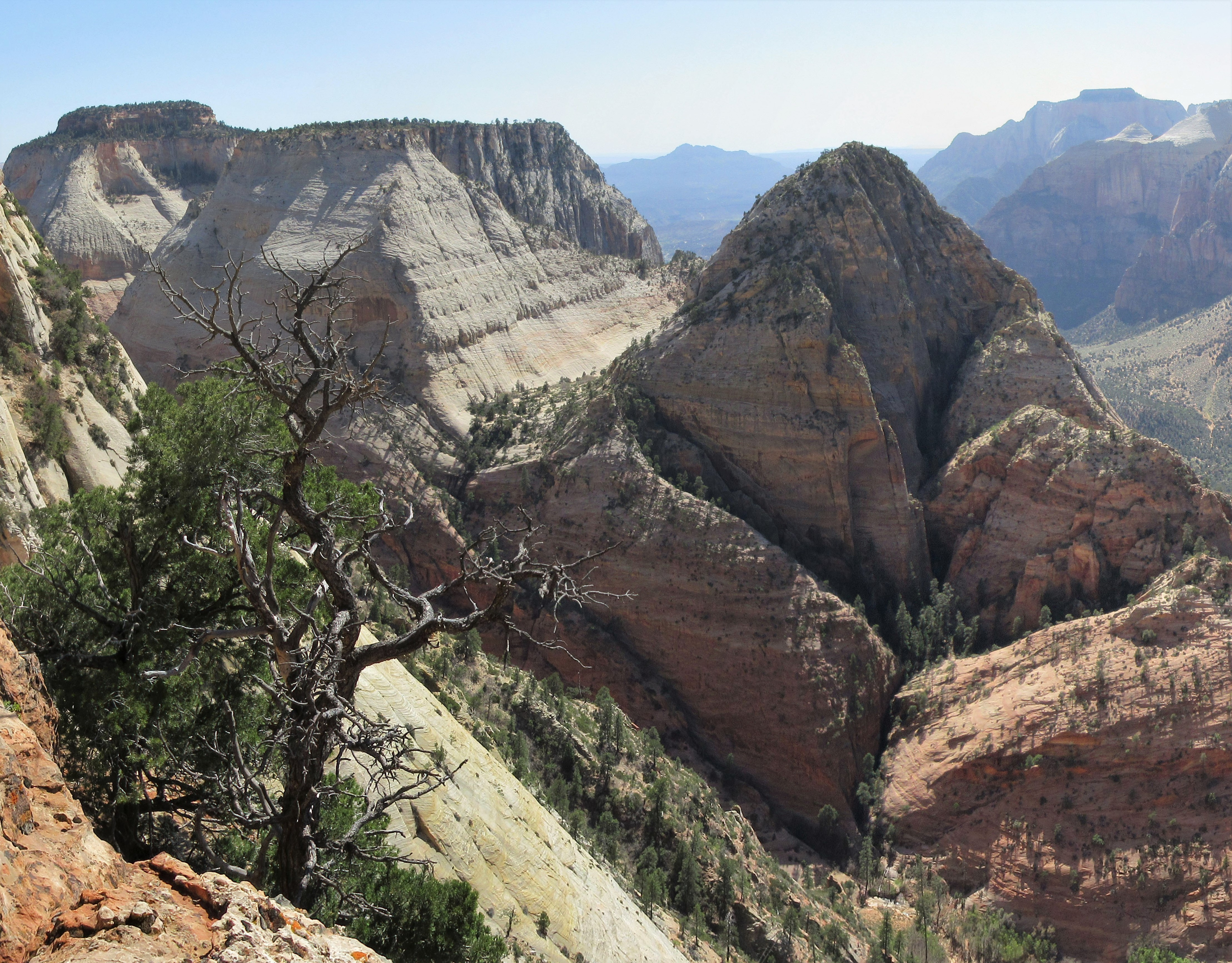
The East Temple (upper left corner), Twin Brothers (left of center), Mountain of the Sun (right) seen from the northeast on Deertrap Mountain

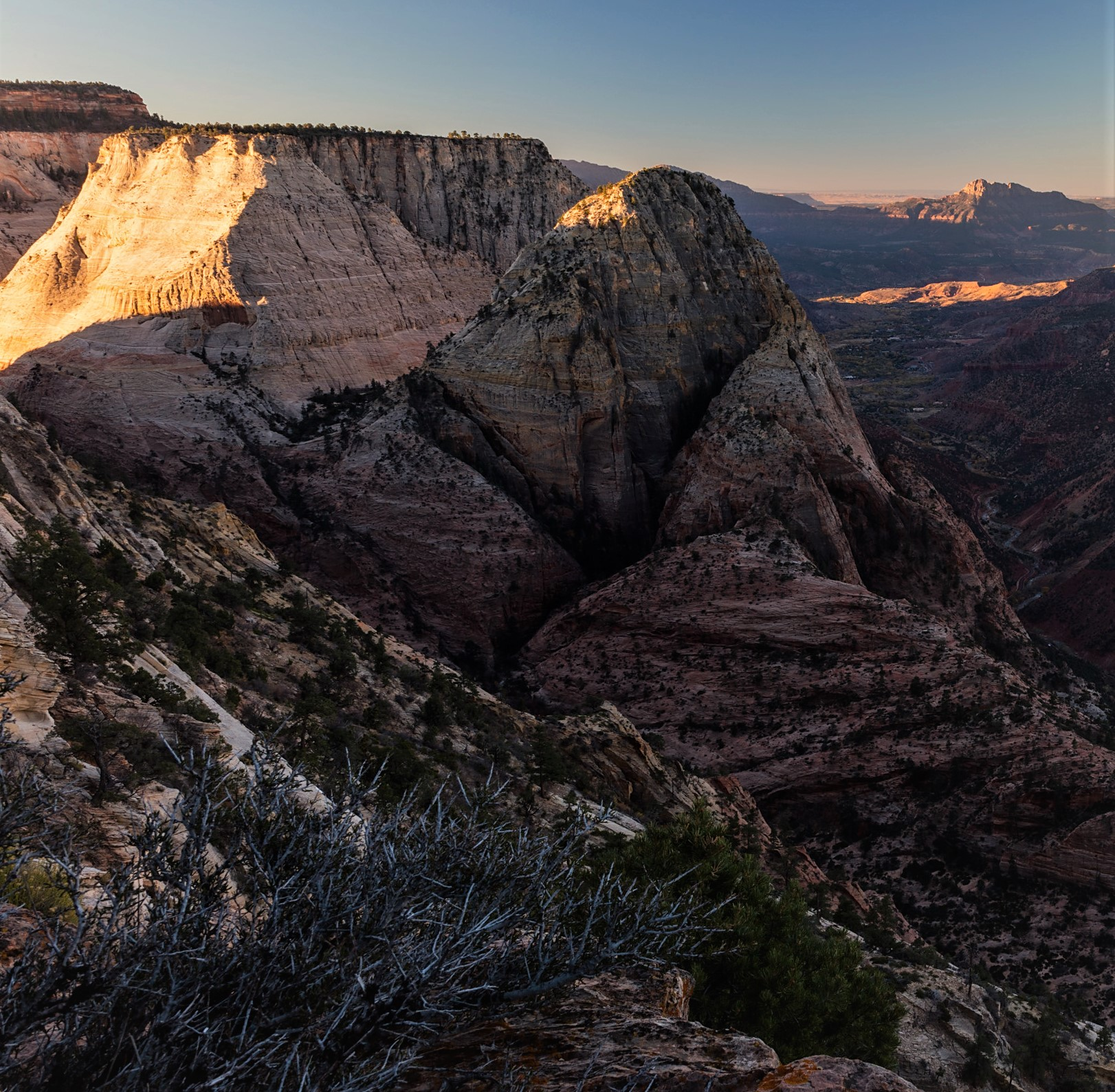
Twin Brothers left, Mountain of the Sun (right) seen from Deertrap Mountain

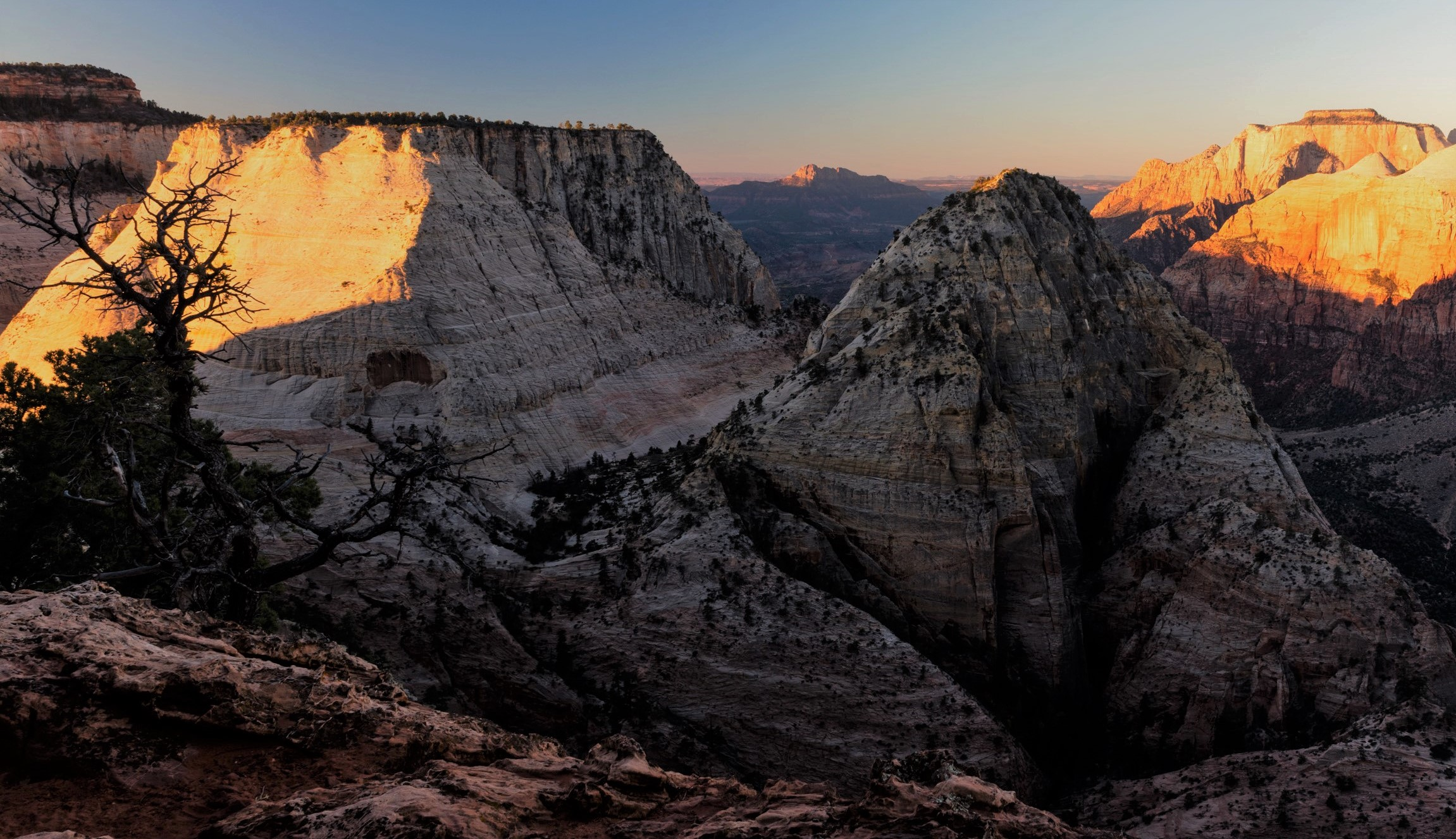
Twin Brothers left with its East Face lit up, Mountain of the Sun (without sun), and The West Temple (upper right) at sunrise

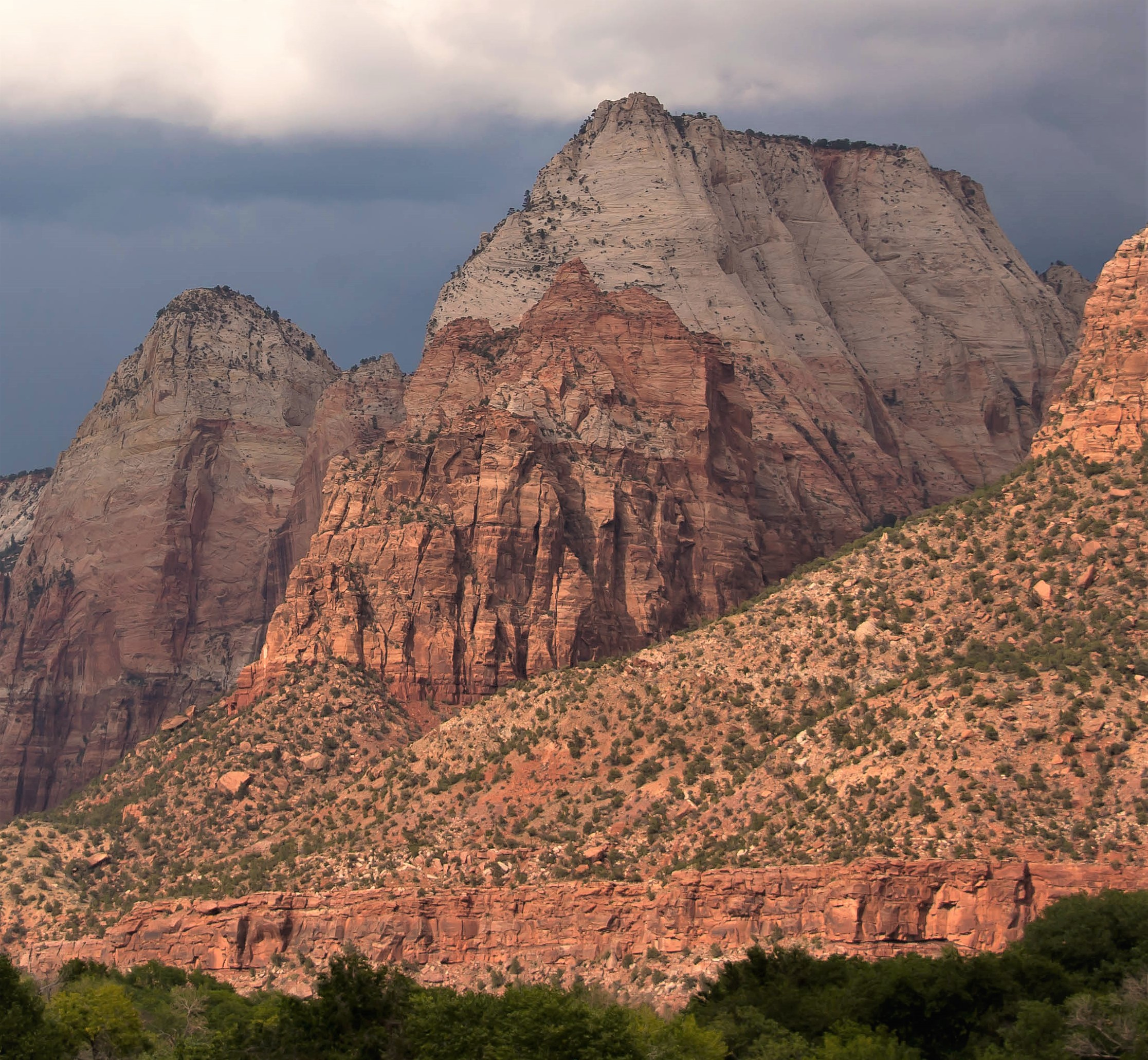
Twin Brothers behind reddish Mt. Spry, with Mountain of the Sun to left

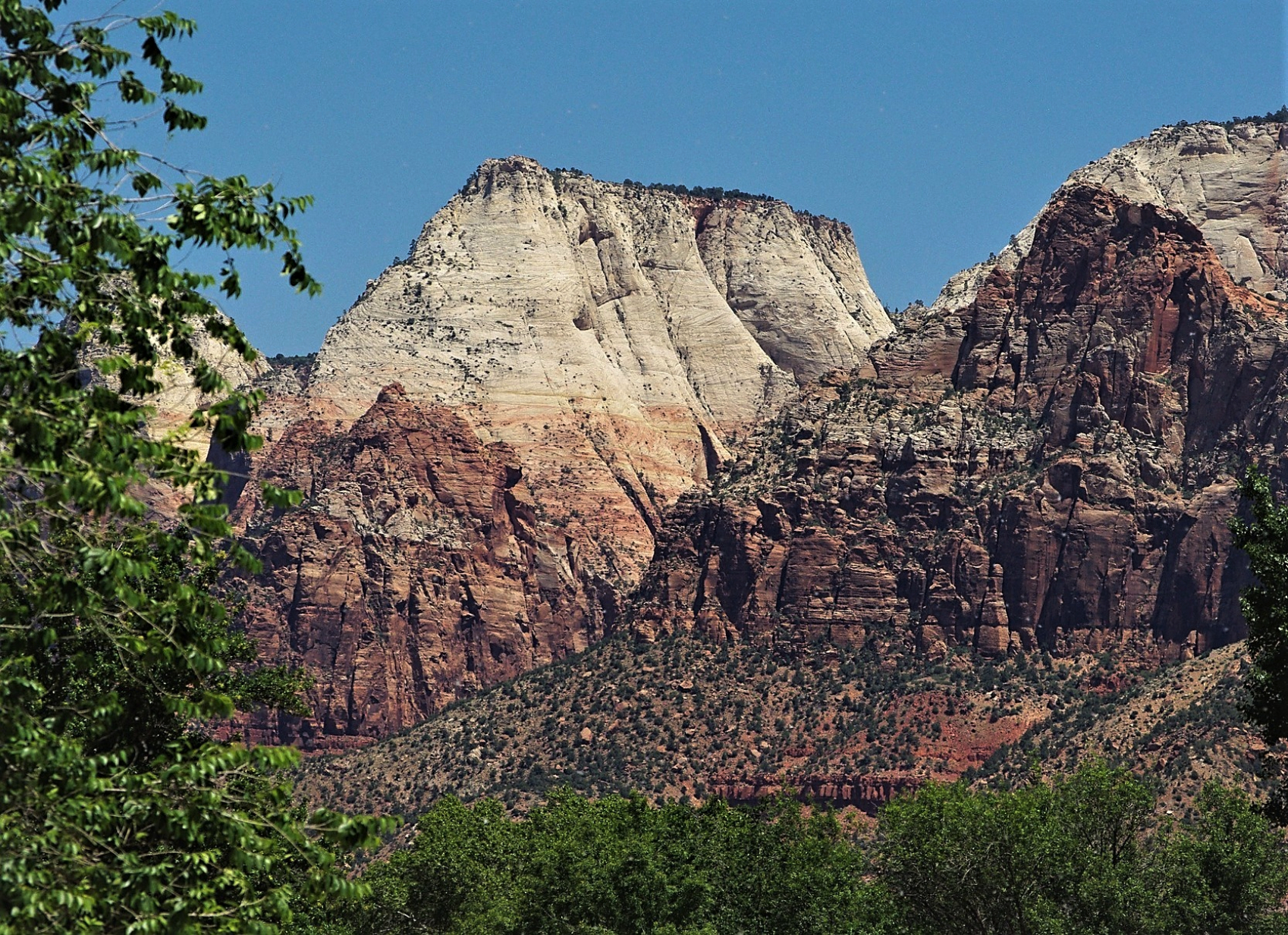

== See also ==
- List of mountains in Utah
- Geology of the Zion and Kolob canyons area
- Colorado Plateau
