= Mount Spry =

Mountain summit in southwest Utah, US

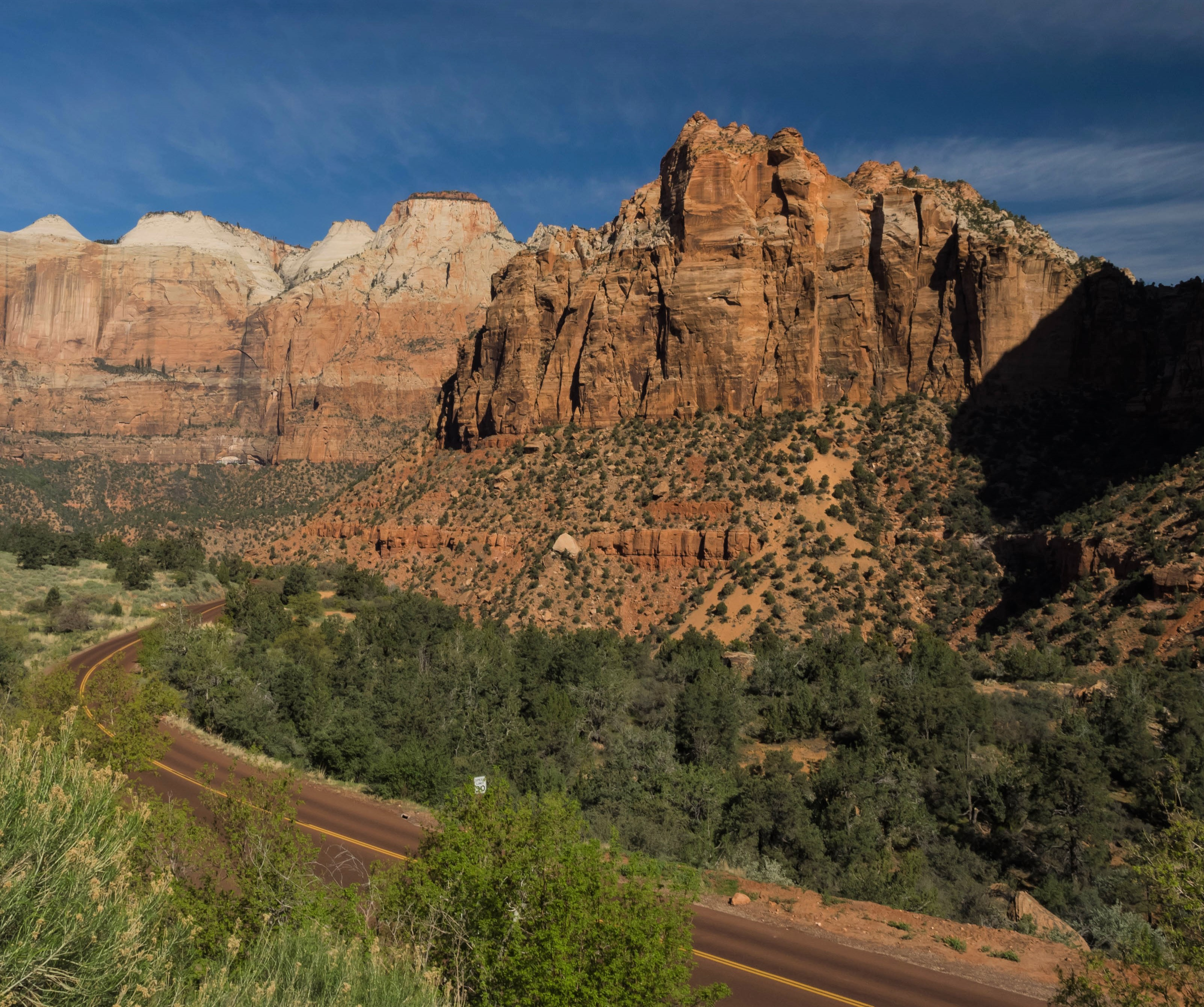
- Mount Spry's southeast aspect (The Sentinel behind left}

Highest point
- Elevation: 5,720 ft (1,740 m)
- Prominence: 440 ft (130 m)
- Coordinates: 37°13′16″N 112°57′50″W

Naming
- Etymology: William Spry

Geography
- Location within Utah Location within the United States
- Country: United States
- State: Utah
- County: Washington
- Protected area: Zion National Park
- Parent range: Colorado Plateau
- Topo map: USGS Springdale East

Geology
- Rock age: Jurassic
- Rock type: Navajo sandstone

Climbing
- Easiest route: Scrambling class 4

Mount Spry is a small 5,720-ft elevation mountain summit made of Navajo Sandstone located in Zion National Park, in Washington County of southwest Utah, United States. Officially named in 1934, it honors William Spry (1864–1929), the third governor of Utah. The nearest higher peak is The East Temple, 0.34 miles (0.55 km) to the east. Precipitation runoff from the mountain drains into tributaries of the North Fork Virgin River.

== Climbing Routes ==
Climbing Routes on Mount Spry

- Holy Roller - class 5.10d - 5 pitches
- Swamp Donkey - class 5.12a - 5 pitches
- Shark Tooth Freighter - class 5.10 - 3 pitches

== Climate ==
Spring and fall are the most favorable seasons to visit Mount Spry. According to the Köppen climate classification system, it is located in a Cold semi-arid climate zone, which is defined by the coldest month having an average mean temperature below 32 °F (0 °C), and at least 50% of the total annual precipitation being received during the spring and summer. This desert climate receives less than 10 inches (250 millimeters) of annual rainfall, and snowfall is generally light during the winter.

== See also ==
- Geology of the Zion and Kolob canyons area
- Colorado Plateau

== Gallery ==
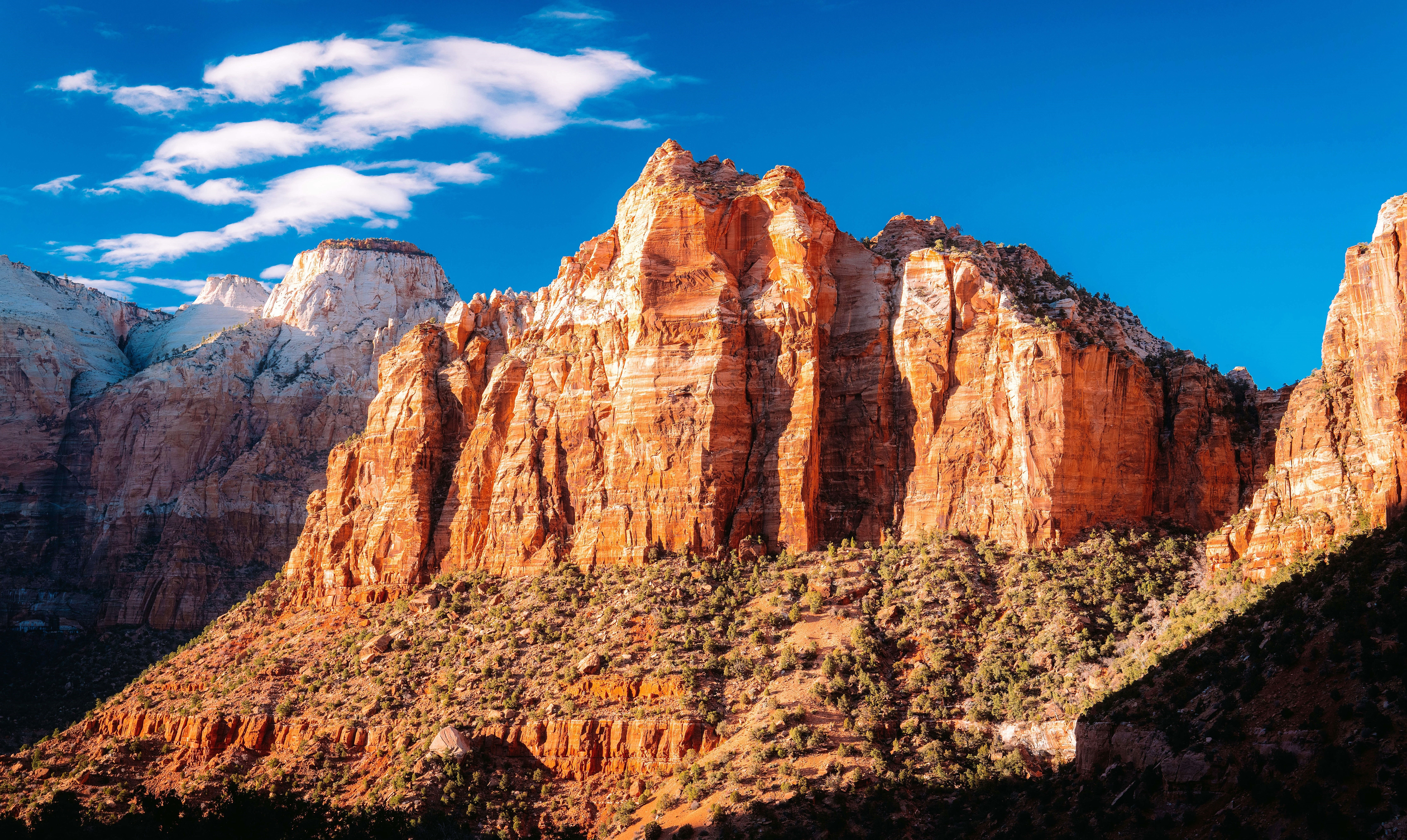
Southeast aspect

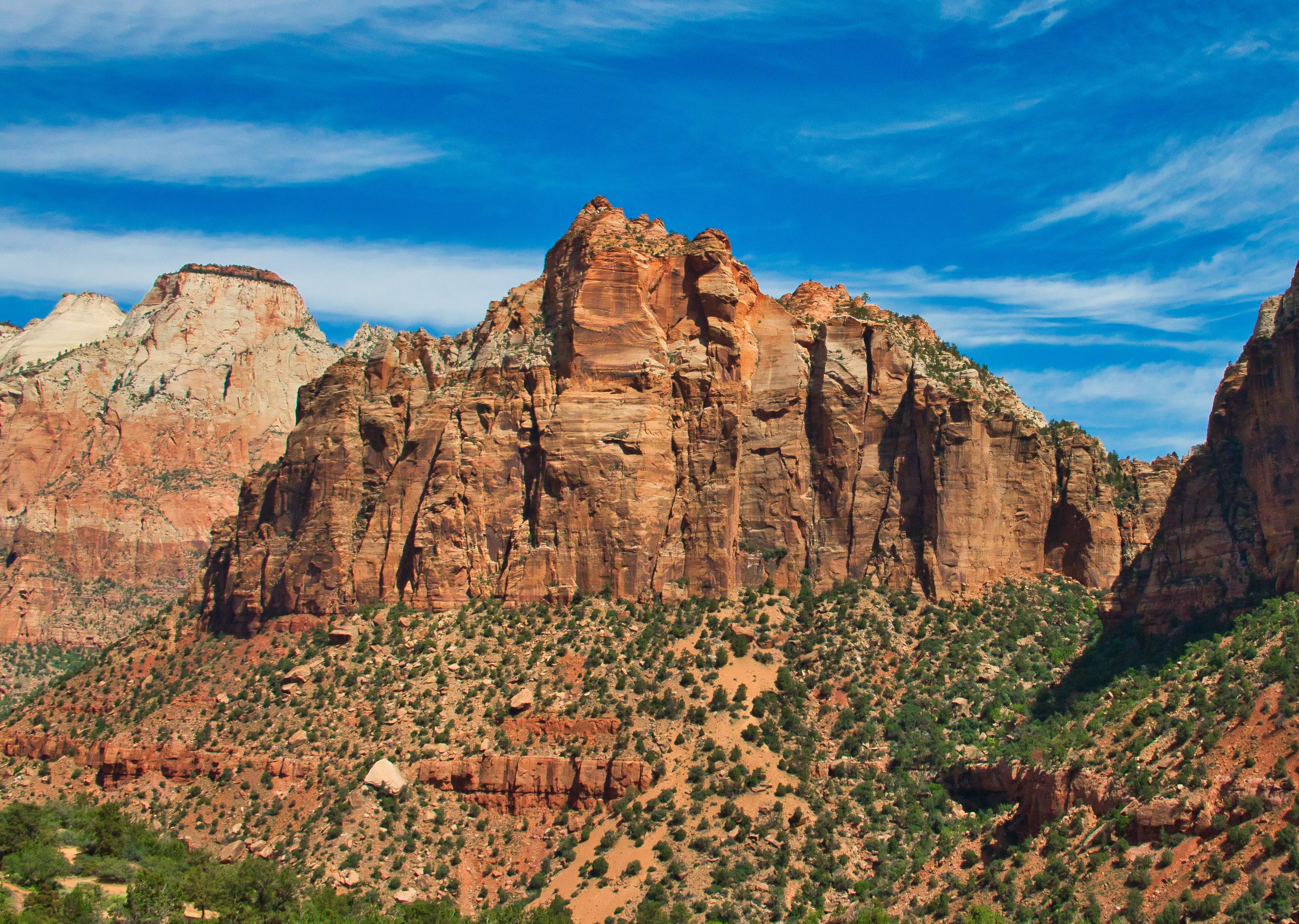
Southeast aspect

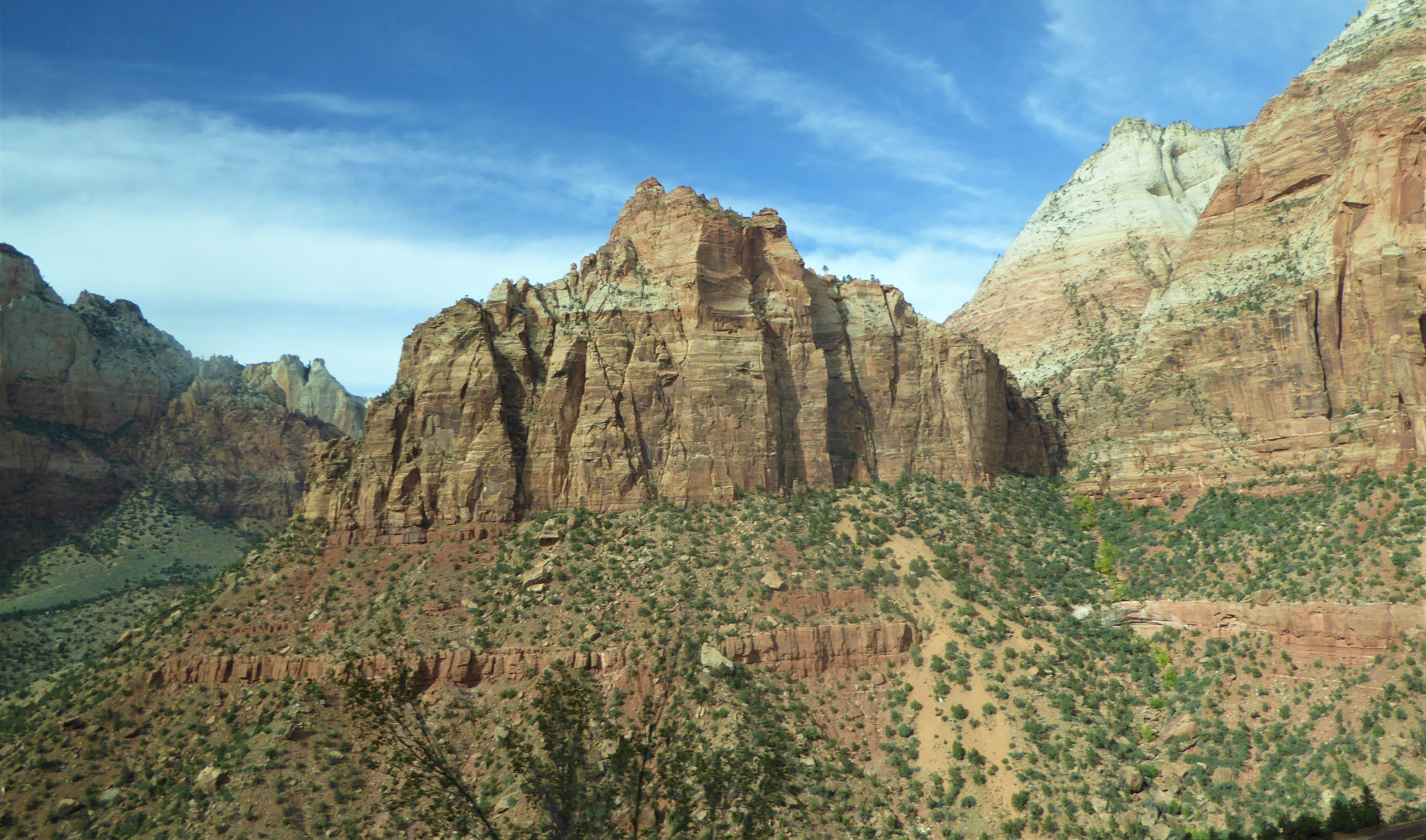
South aspect

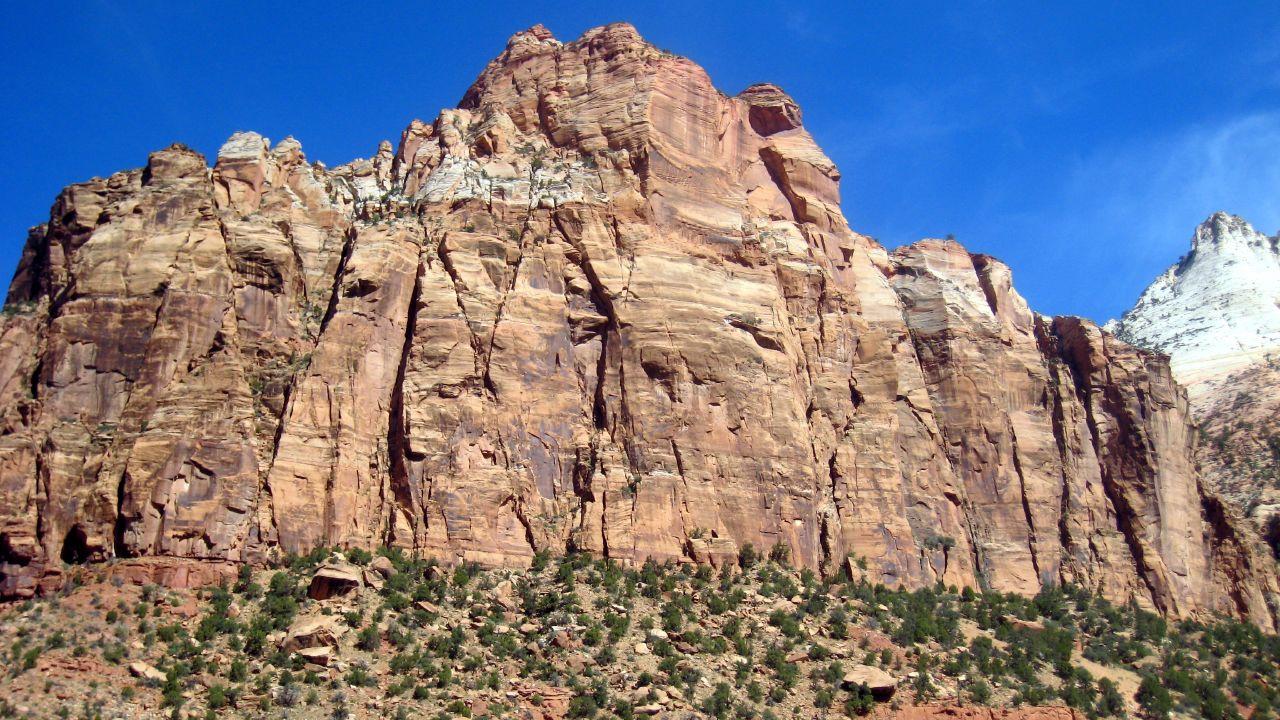
South aspect

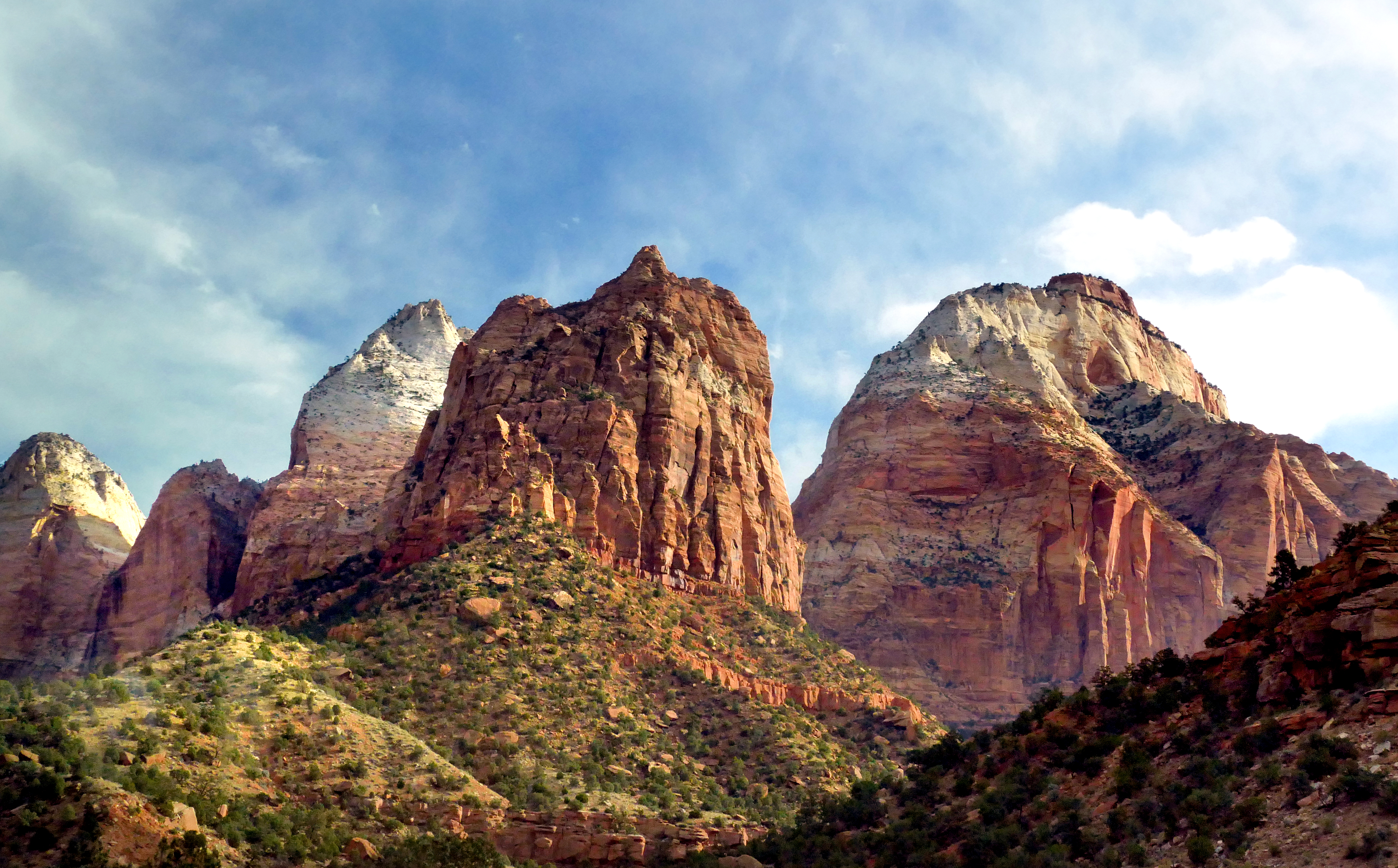
Left to right: Mountain of the Sun, Twin Brothers, Mt. Spry (center), The East Temple

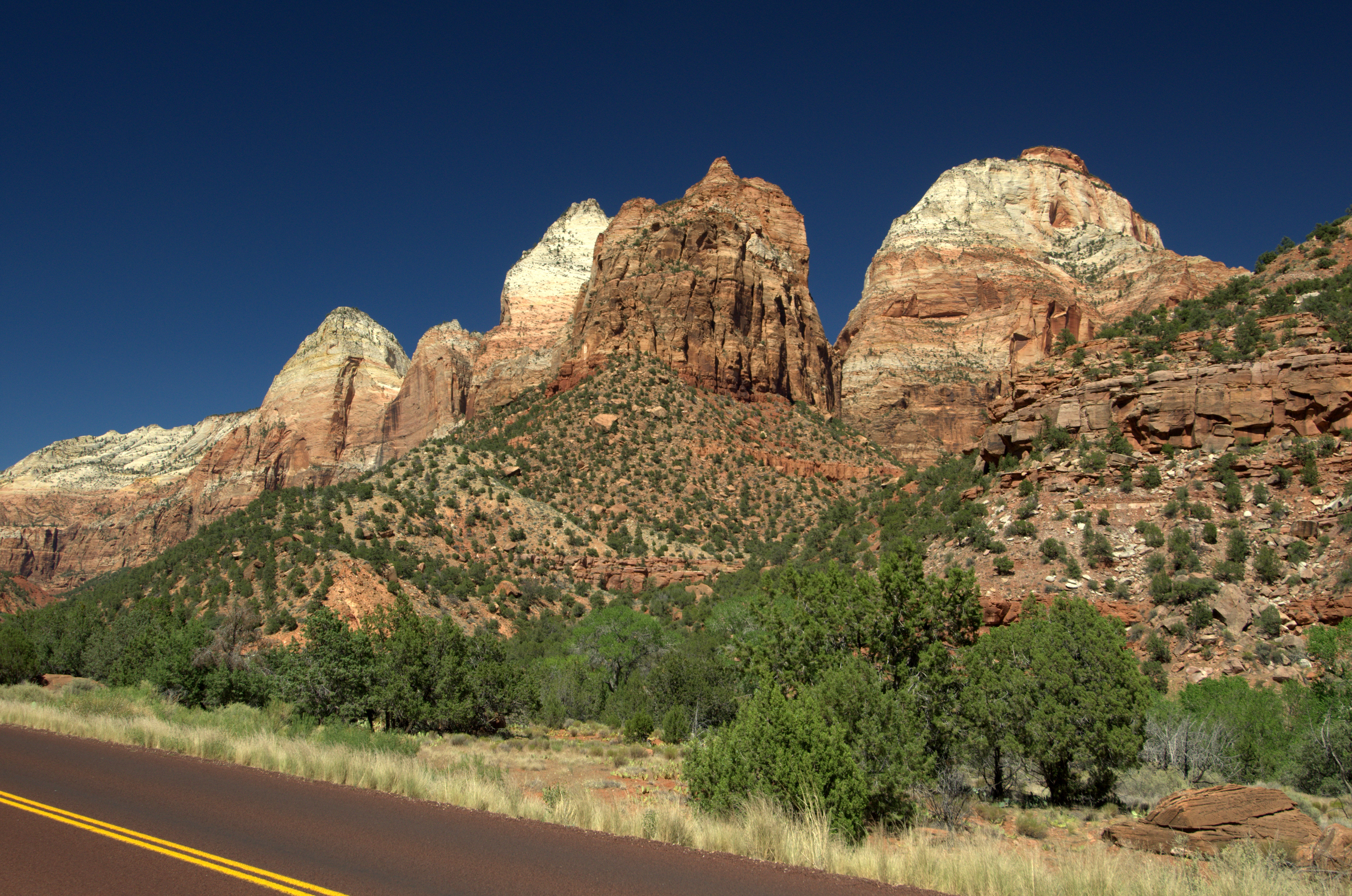
Left to right: Mountain of the Sun, Twin Brothers, Mt. Spry (center), The East Temple

Mt. Spry with The Sentinel (left)

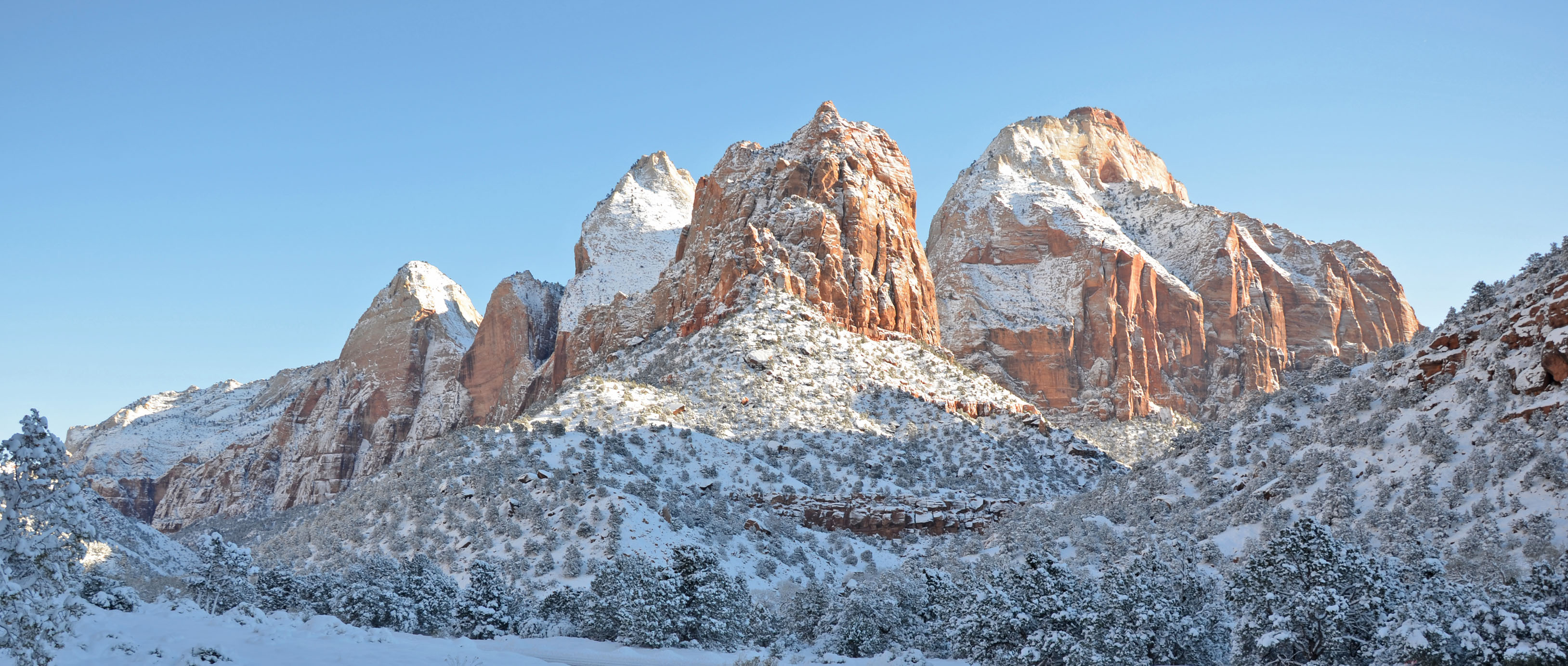
Mountain of the Sun, Twin Brothers, Mt. Spry (center), The East Temple in winter

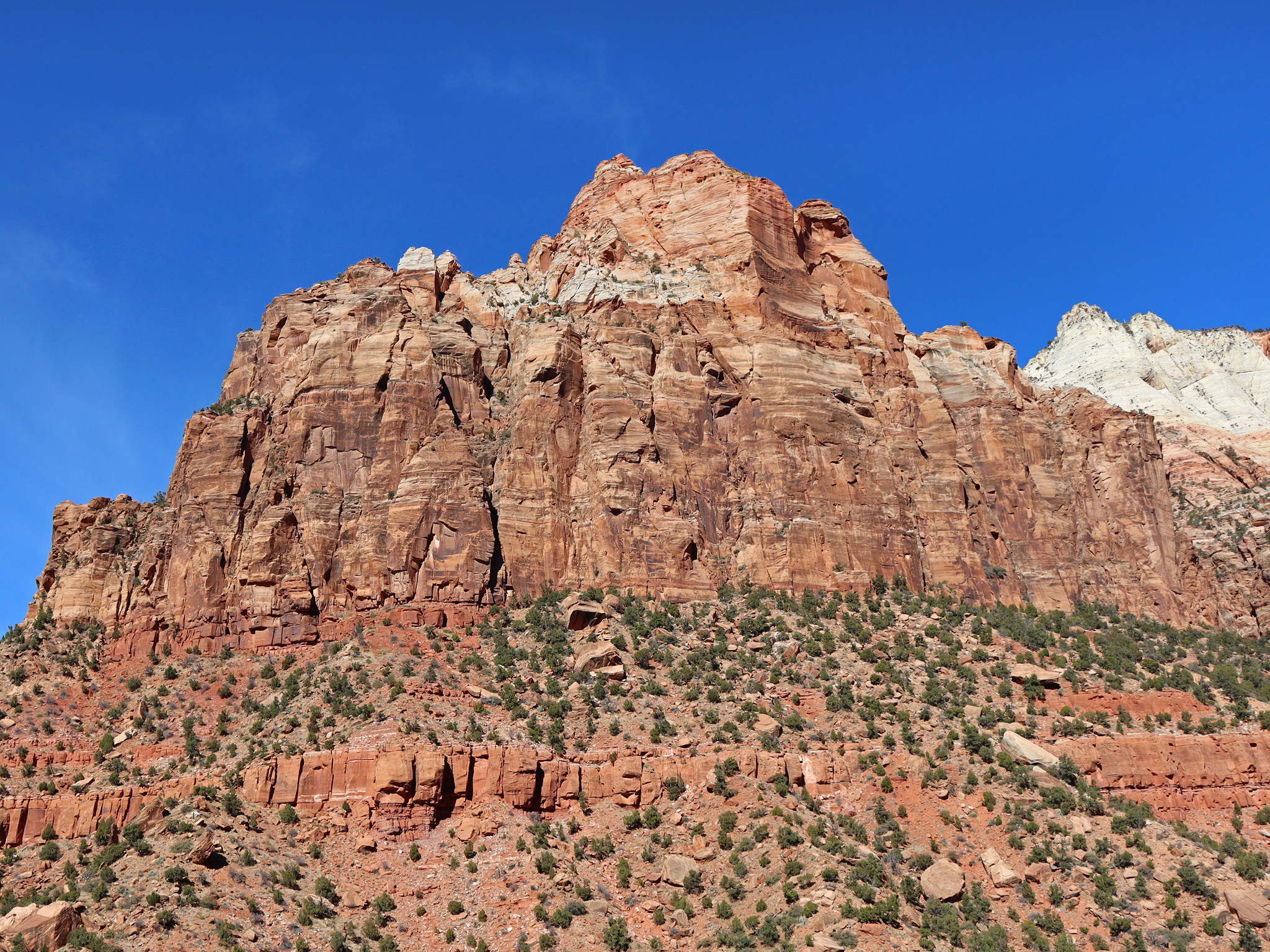
