= The East Temple =

Mountain in the state of Utah

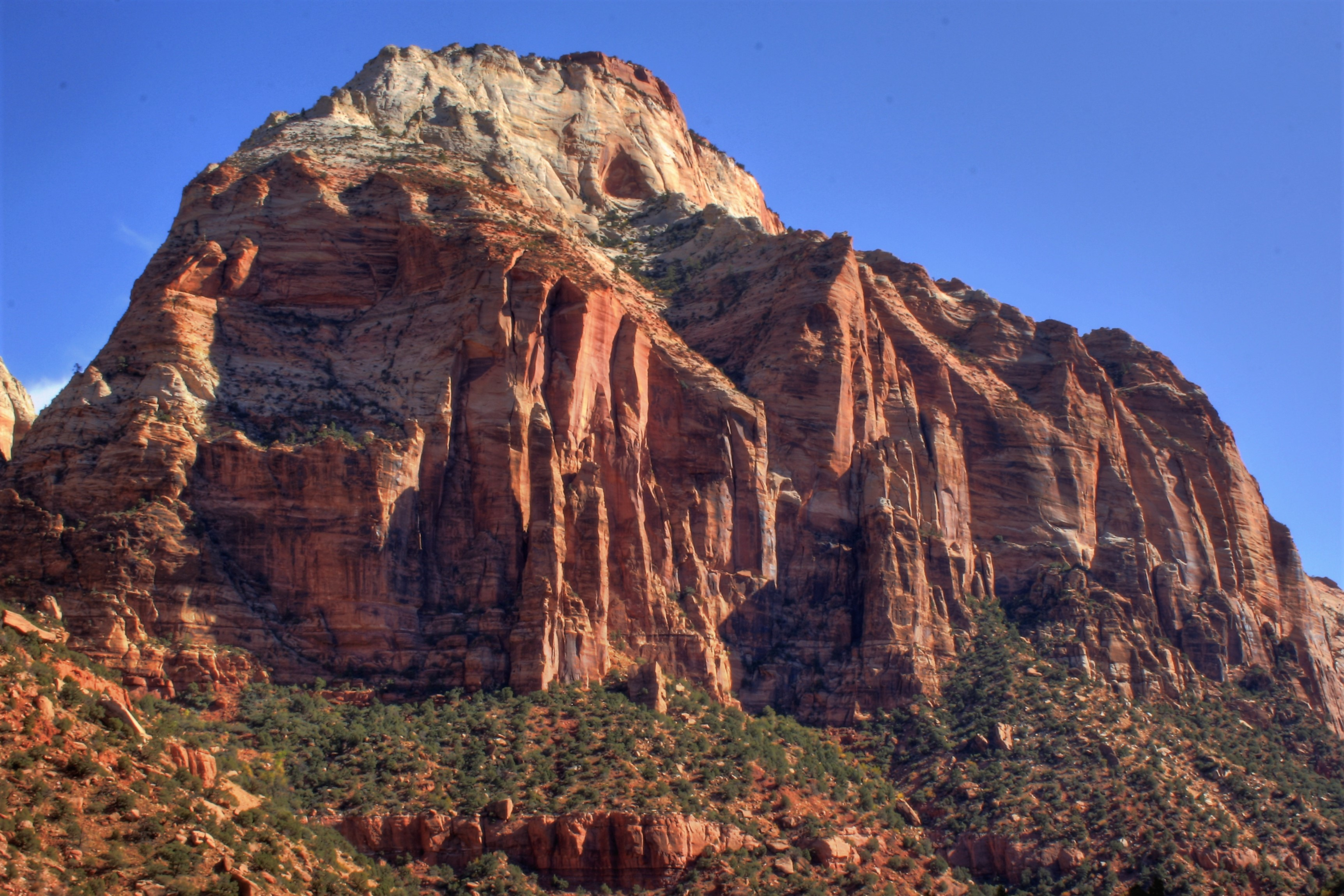
- The East Temple, west aspect

Highest point
- Elevation: 7,709 ft (2,350 m)
- Prominence: 1,709 ft (521 m)
- Parent peak: The West Temple (7,810 ft)
- Isolation: 3.9 mi (6.3 km)
- Coordinates: 37°13′14″N 112°57′03″W

Geography
- Location within Utah Location within the United States
- Country: United States
- State: Utah
- County: Washington
- Protected area: Zion National Park
- Parent range: Colorado Plateau
- Topo map: USGS Springdale East

Geology
- Rock age: Jurassic
- Rock type: Navajo sandstone

Climbing
- First ascent: 1937
- Easiest route: class 5.4 climbing

The East Temple is a prominent 7,709 feet (2,350 m) summit composed of Navajo Sandstone in Zion National Park, in Washington County of southwest Utah, United States. It is one of the notable landmarks in the park. The nearest neighbor is Twin Brothers, one-half mile to the north, and the nearest higher peak is The West Temple, 3.85 miles (6.20 km) to the west-southwest. The mountain is situated 1.8 miles northeast of the park headquarters, at the confluence of Pine Creek and the North Fork Virgin River. This feature's name was applied by John Wesley Powell during his explorations in 1872, and was officially adopted in 1934 by the U.S. Board on Geographic Names. The first ascent was made in 1937 by Glen Dawson, Dick Jones, Homer Fuller, Wayland Gilbert, and Jo Momyer.

== Climbing Routes ==
Climbing Routes on The East Temple

- Casual Route - class 5.4 - 4 pitches
- Fang Spire - class 5.9 - 5 pitches
- Lovelace - class 5.10 - 9 pitches
- Cowboy Bob Goes to Zion - class 5.10 - 10 pitches
- Mobius - class 5.11 - 5 pitches

== Climate ==
Spring and fall are the most favorable seasons to visit The East Temple. According to the Köppen climate classification system, it is located in a Cold semi-arid climate zone, which is defined by the coldest month having an average mean temperature below 32 °F (0 °C), and at least 50% of the total annual precipitation being received during the spring and summer. This desert climate receives less than 10 inches (250 millimeters) of annual rainfall, and snowfall is generally light during the winter.

== Gallery ==
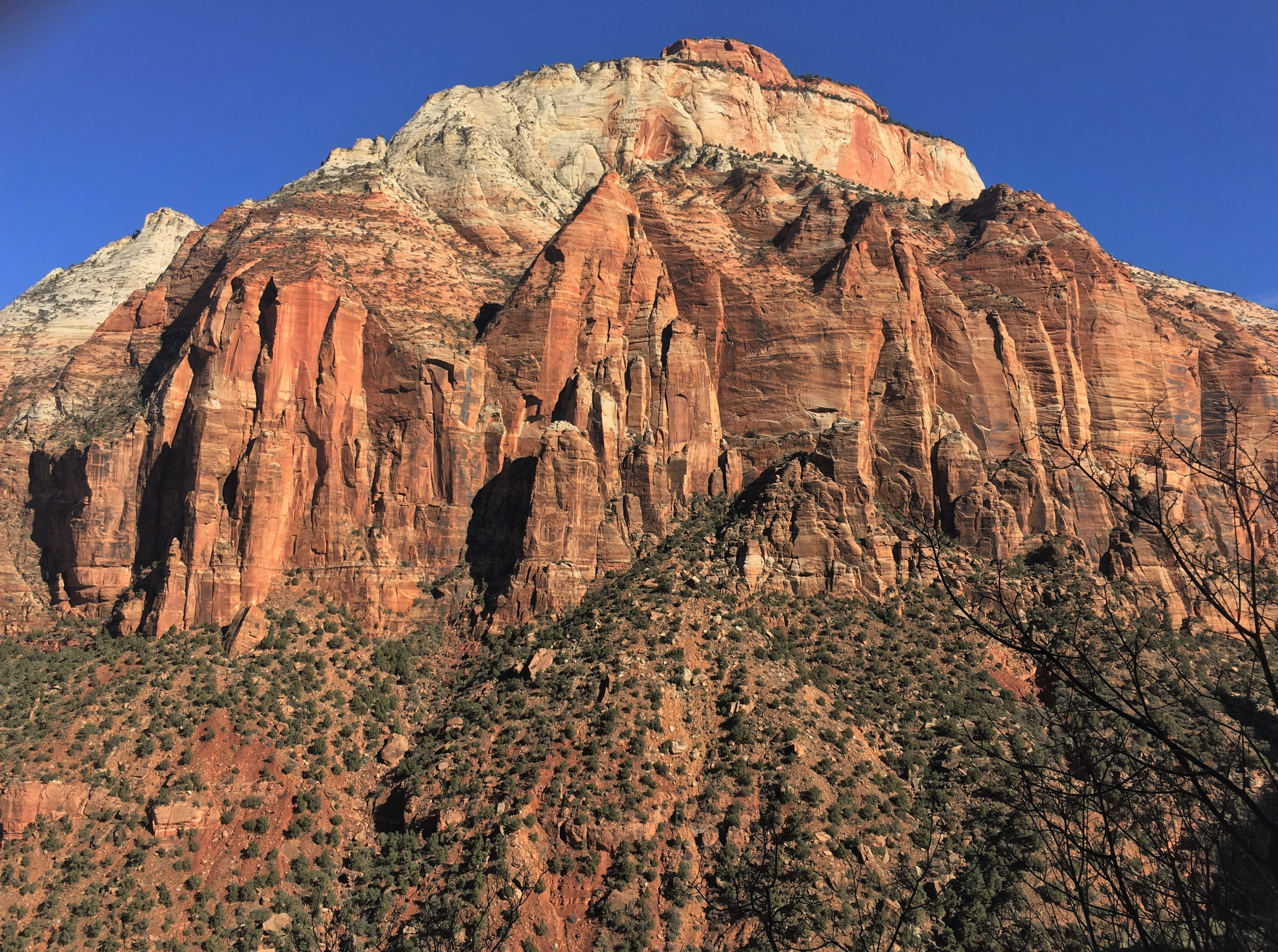
South aspect

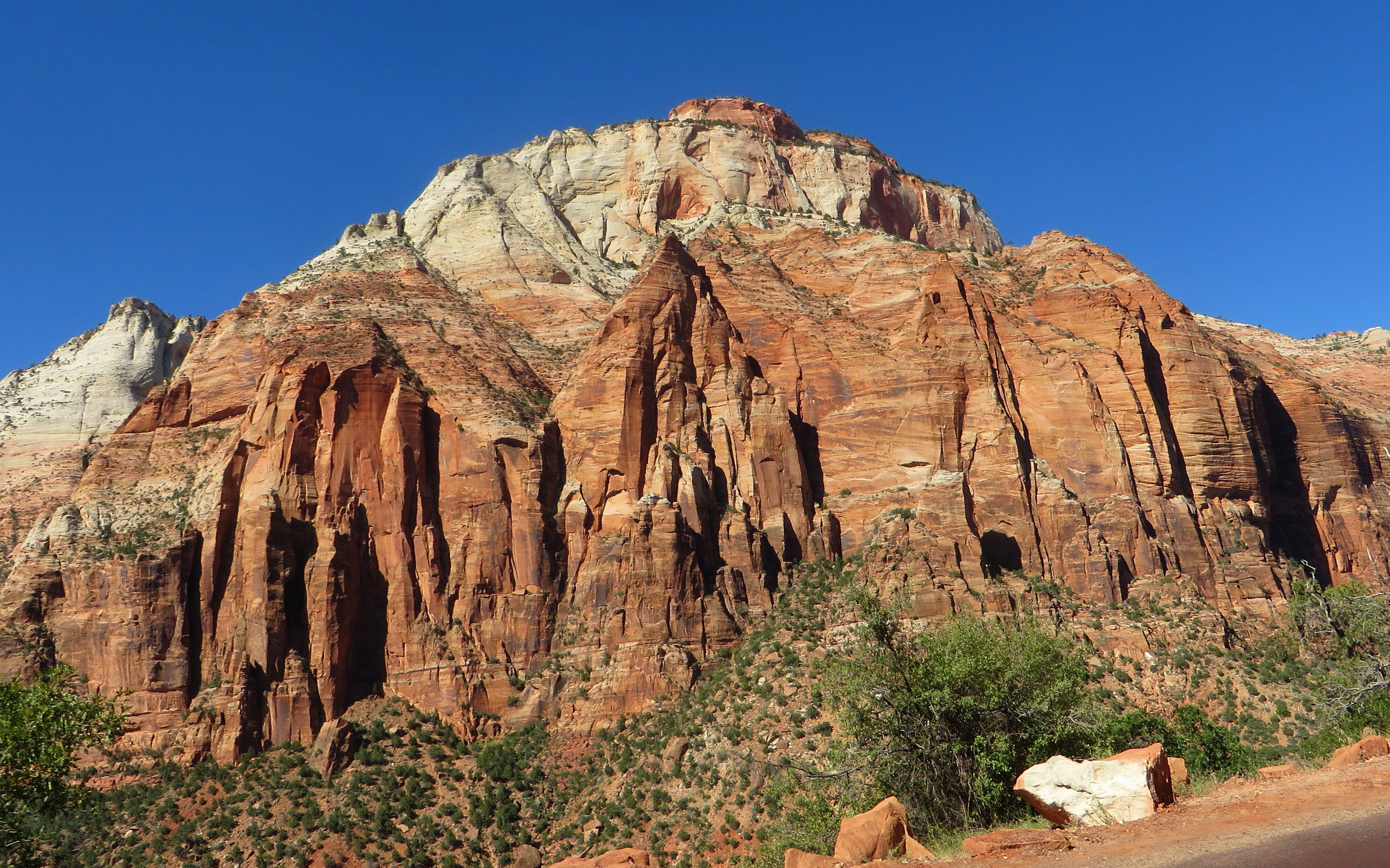
South aspect from Highway 9

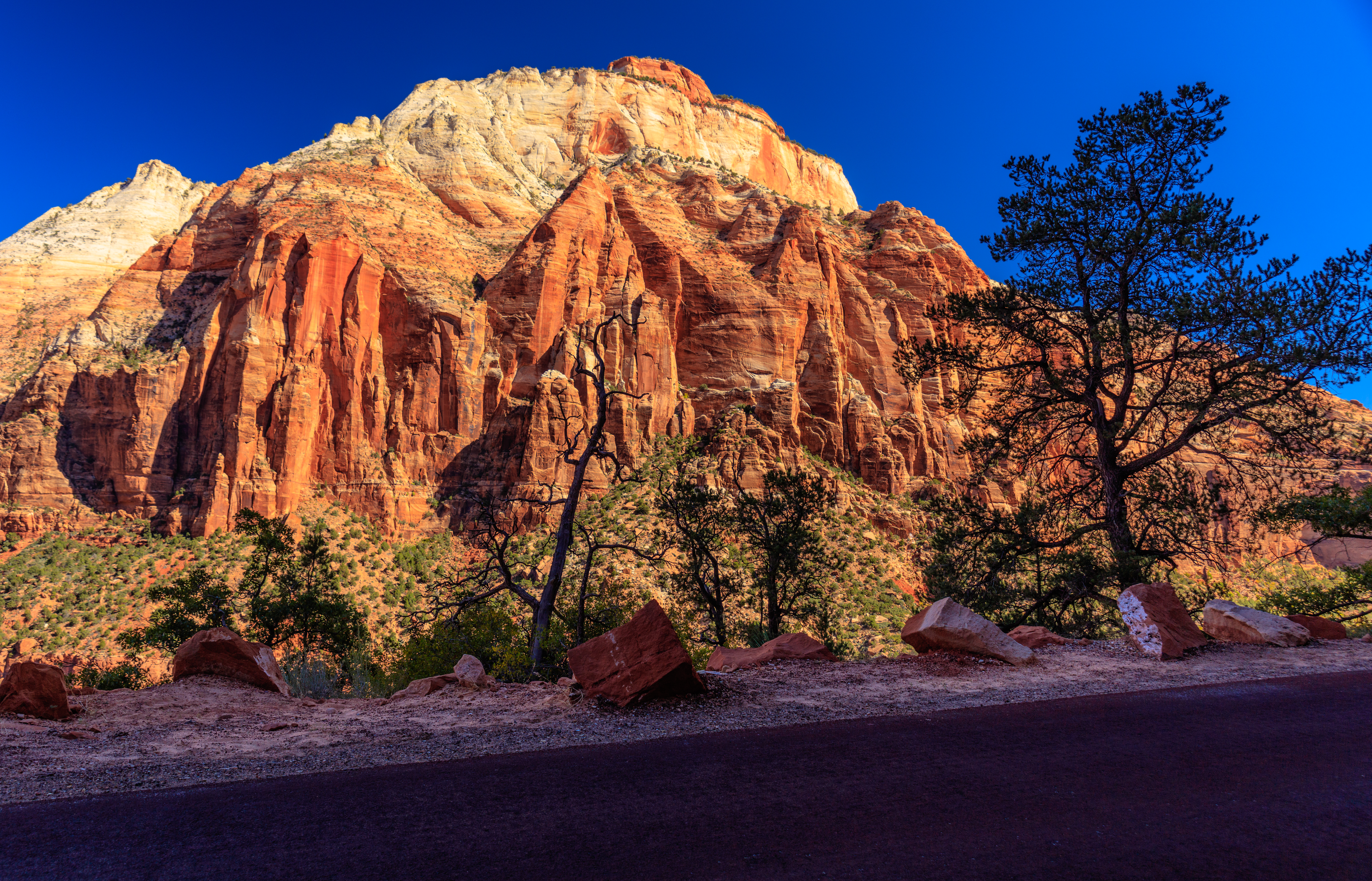
The East Temple

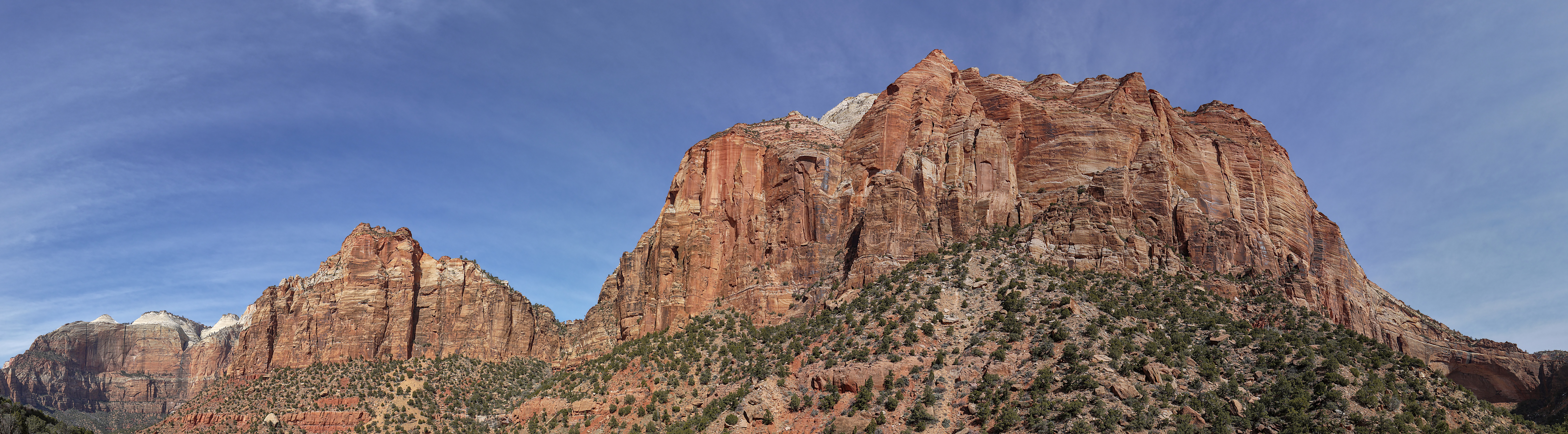
Mount Spry (left) with The East Temple (right)

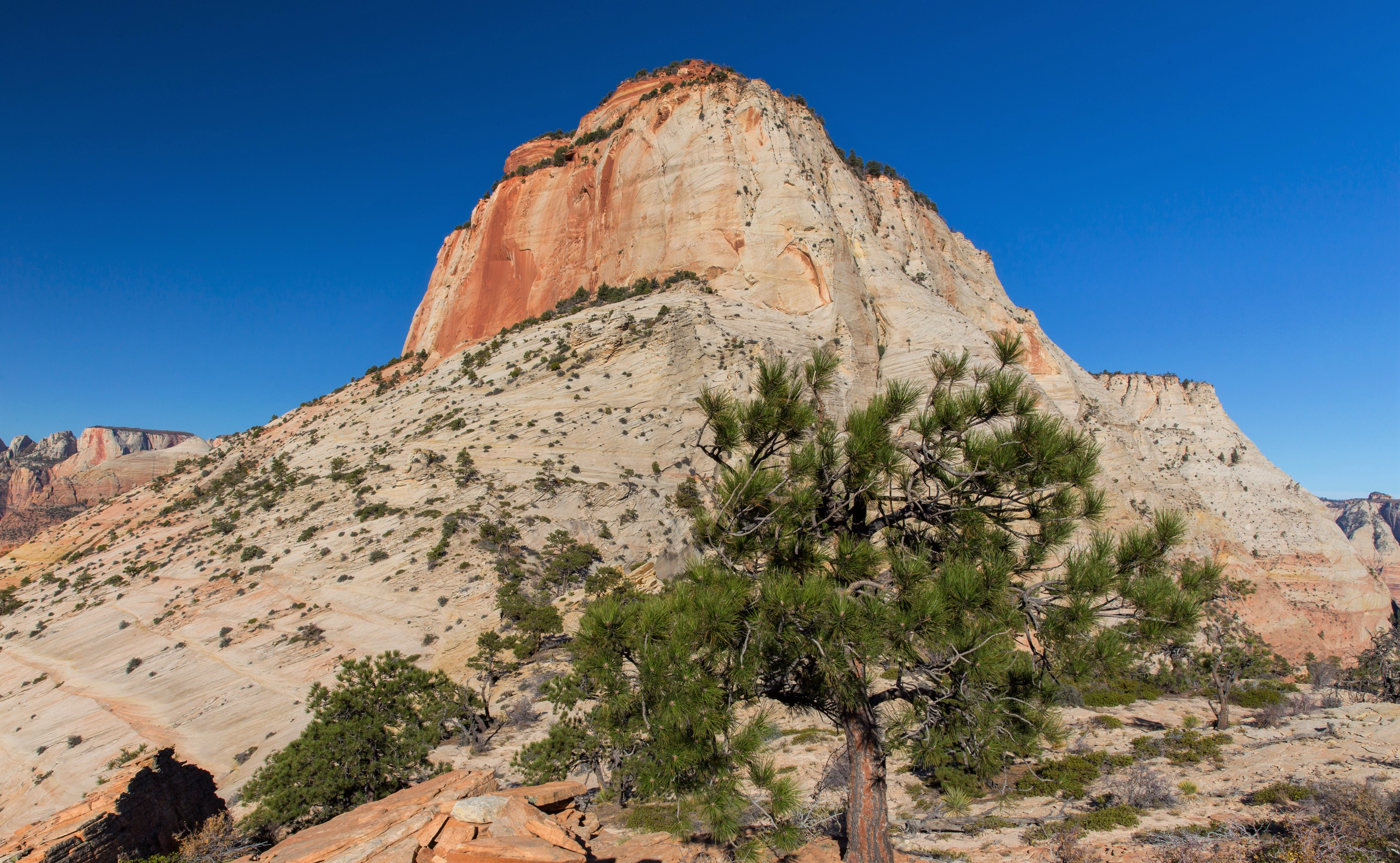
East aspect of The East Temple

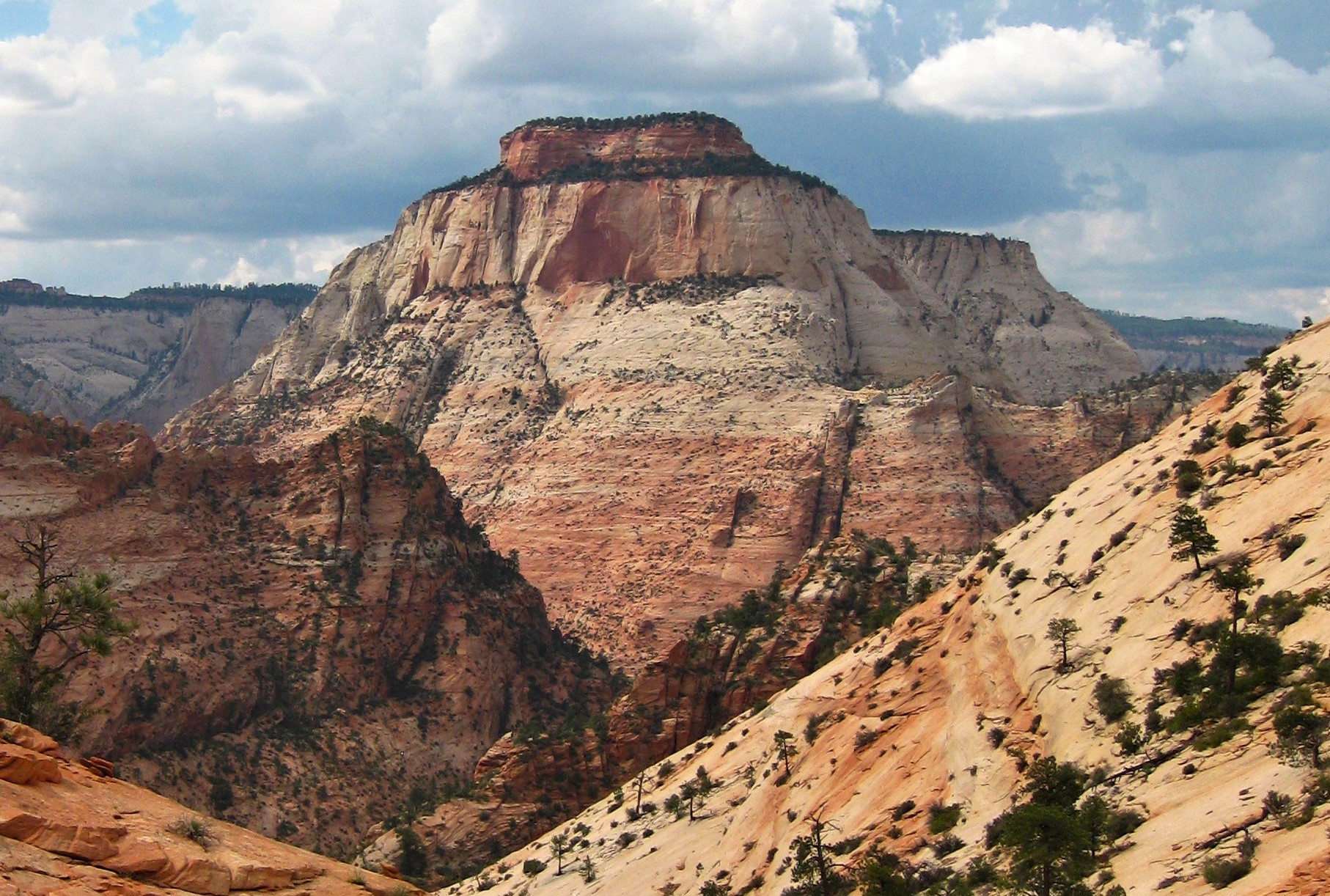
The East Temple

== See also ==
- Geology of the Zion and Kolob canyons area
- Colorado Plateau
