= Laurel J. Brinton =

Canadian linguist

- Born: 1953 (age 72–73); United States
- Education: University of California, Davis; University of California, Berkeley
- Father: Robert K. Brinton
- Relatives: Louise Brinton (sister); Donna Brinton (sister)
- Awards: Killam Research Prize (1998)

Academic background
- Thesis: The Historical Development of Aspectual Periphrases in English
- Doctoral advisor: Julian C. Boyd

Laurel J. Brinton (born 1953) is an American-born Canadian linguist.

Her research explores areas of Modern English grammar, historical change in English discourse markers, grammaticalization and lexification in English, corpus linguistics, and the pragmatics of English.

Her body of linguistic research spans several decades, with a focus on English linguistics. Her premier work is Lexicalization and Language Change, which focuses on understanding the relationship between lexicalization and grammaticalization in language change. The book was the first to attempt a unified report of all existing approaches to lexicalization.

She has made significant contributions in the areas of historical discourse analysis and corpus linguistics, especially with respect to historical corpora. She has completed a number of diachronic studies of the English language, including examinations of comment clauses and pragmatic markers, the latter of which has been taught as a university course with much discussion on her theories of pragmatics and discourse markers.

She was part of the team who set up the Dictionary of Canadianisms on Historical Principles, 1st edition, in an online form.

She is the daughter of Robert K. Brinton. Her sisters are epidemiologist Louise A. Brinton and author and educator Donna M. Brinton.

== Academic credentials ==
Dr. Brinton received her B.A. in English Literature from the University of California, Davis in 1975. Six years later, she received her Ph.D. in English with a linguistics emphasis from the University of California, Berkeley (1981) under the supervision of Julian C. Boyd. Her dissertation was entitled "The Historical Development of Aspectual Periphrases in English."

She joined the faculty at the University of British Columbia, Vancouver, after completing her doctorate degree. In 1995, she obtained the rank of Professor. She formerly served as Associate Head of the English Department for Graduate Studies at the university from 1997 to 1999. She also served as chair of the English Language Program in the Department of English at the University of British Columbia for many years. She served as a co-editor of the Journal of Historical Pragmatics alongside Dawn Archer from April 2013 to December 2014. She is a current member of several journal editorial boards and has reviewed for widely-known journals such as Journal of English Linguistics, Language, Journal of Pragmatics, and English Language and Linguistics, the last of which she has been a co-editor of since 2015 alongside Bernd Kortman and Patrick Honeybone.

In June 2023, Brinton retired from the University of British Columbia, where she is currently listed as Professor Emerita.

== Awards and distinctions ==
Brinton won the Killam Research Prize in 1998, and was awarded a Killam Faculty Research Fellowship in 2005, an award granted to "full professors at Canadian universities and research institutes, who have an outstanding reputation in their area of research.

== Publications ==
Authored books

- Brinton, Laurel J. The Evolution of Pragmatic Markers in English: Pathways of Change. Cambridge University Press, 2017, ISBN 9781107129054.
- Brinton, Laurel J. & Arnovick, Leslie K. The English Language: A Linguistic History. Oxford University Press, 2017 [2006], 3rd edition, ISBN 9780199019151.
- Brinton, Laurel J. & Arnovick, Leslie K. The English Language: A Linguistic History. Oxford University Press, 2011 [2006], 2nd edition, ISBN 9780195431575.
- Brinton, Laurel J. & Brinton, Donna M. The Linguistic Structure of Modern English. John Benjamins Publishing Company, 2010 [2000], 2nd edition, ISBN 9789027211729.
- Brinton, Laurel J. The Comment Clause in English: Syntactic Origins and Pragmatic Development. Cambridge University Press, 2008, ISBN 9780521886734.
- Brinton, Laurel J. & Arnovick, Leslie K. The English Language: A Linguistic History. Oxford University Press, 2006, ISBN 0195422058.
- Brinton, Laurel J. & Traugott, Elizabeth Closs. Lexicalization and Language Change. Cambridge University Press, 2005, ISBN 9780521833103.
- Brinton, Laurel J. The Structure of Modern English: A Linguistic Introduction. John Benjamins Publishing Company, 2000, ISBN 9781556196621.
- Brinton, Laurel J. Pragmatic Markers in English: Grammaticalization and Discourse Functions. Walter de Gruyter, 1996, ISBN 3110148722.
- Brinton, Laurel J. The Development of English Aspectual Systems: Aspectualizer and Post-verbal Particles. Cambridge University Press, 1988.

Edited books

- Brinton Laurel J. (ed.). English Historical Linguistics: Approaches and Perspectives. Cambridge University Press, 2017, ISBN 9781107113640.
- Adams, Michael, Brinton, Laurel J. & Fulk R. D. (eds.). Studies in the History of the English Language VI: Evidence and Methods in Histories of English. Walter de Gruyter GmbH, 2015, ISBN 9783110345919.
- Bergs, Alexander. & Brinton, Laurel J. (eds.). English Historical Linguistics: An International Handbook. Volume 2, Walter de Gruyter, 2012, ISBN 9783110202656.
- Bergs, Alexander. & Brinton, Laurel J. (eds.). English Historical Linguistics: An International Handbook. Volume 1, Walter de Gruyter, 2012, ISBN 9783110202205.
- Brinton, Laurel J. (ed.). Historical Linguistics 1999: Selected Papers from the 14th International Conference on Historical Linguistics. John Benjamins Publishing Company, 2001, ISBN 9781588110640.
- Brinton, Laurel J. & Akimoto, Minoji (eds.). Collocational and Idiomatic Aspects of Composite Predicates in the History of English. John Benjamins Publishing Company, 1999, ISBN 9781556199332.

Articles

- Brinton, Laurel J. 2014. "The extremes of insubordination: Exclamatory as if". Journal of English Linguistics 42(2). 93–113. doi:10.1177/0075424214521425
- Brinton, Laurel J. 2014. "Comparative studies in early Germanic languages: With a focus on verbal categories". Diachronica 31(4). 564–570. doi:10.1075/dia.31.4.05bri
- Brinton, Laurel J. & Traugott, Elizabeth Closs. 2007. "Lexicalization and grammaticalization all over again". Historical Linguistics 2005. 3–19. doi:10.1075/cilt.284.03bri
- Brinton, Laurel J. 2001. "Pathways of Change: Grammaticalization in English". Journal of English Linguistics 29(4). 372–375. Retrieved from https://doi.org/10.1177/00754240122005512
- Brinton, Laurel J. 1999. "Johan Elsness, The perfect and the preterite in contemporary and earlier English". English Language and Linguistics 3(2). 353–370. doi:10.1017/S1360674399220278
- Brinton, Laurel J. 1998. "Aspectuality and countability: A cross-categorial analogy". English Language and Linguistics 2(1). 37–63. doi:10.1017/S136067430000068X
- Brinton, Laurel J. 1987. "The aspectual nature of states and habits". Folia Linguistica: Acta Societatis Linguisticae Europaeae 21(2–4). 195–214. doi:10.1515/flin.1987.21.2-4.195
- Brinton, Laurel J. 1987. "A linguistic approach to certain old English stylistic devices". Studia Neophilologica: A Journal of Germanic and Romance Languages and Literature 59(2), 177–185. doi:10.1080/00393278708587970
- Brinton, Laurel J. 1985. "Verb particles in English: Aspect or aktionsart?" Studia Linguistica 39(2). 157–168. doi:10.1111/j.1467-9582.1985.tb00750.x
