= Louise A. Brinton =

American epidemiologist

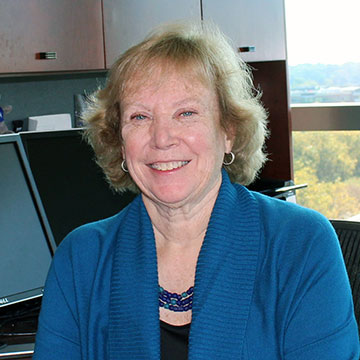
- Education: University of North Carolina at Chapel Hill (M.P.H.); Johns Hopkins Bloomberg School of Public Health (Ph.D.)
- Scientific career
- Fields: Cancer epidemiology, women's health
- Workplaces: National Cancer Institute
- Academic advisors: Richard Doll and Joseph F. Fraumeni, Jr.

Louise Annette Brinton is an American epidemiologist. She was a senior investigator, Chief of the Hormonal and Reproductive Epidemiology Branch, and the first Scientific Advisor for International Activities of the National Cancer Institute Division of Cancer Epidemiology and Genetics.

== Early life and education ==
Brinton was born to Mary Mies and Robert K. Brinton, a chemist and rock climber. Her sisters, Laurel J. Brinton and Donna M. Brinton, are both linguists.

As an undergraduate, Brinton attended Beloit College, where she majored in anthropology. She subsequently earned an M.P.H. in epidemiology from the University of North Carolina at Chapel Hill. Brinton joined the National Cancer Institute (NCI) Division of Cancer Epidemiology and Genetics (DCEG) as a predoctoral staff fellow in 1976. She earned a Ph.D. in epidemiology from Johns Hopkins Bloomberg School of Public Health in 1979, and subsequently conducted postdoctoral research at Oxford University under the tutelage of Richard Doll, before returning to NCI, where she worked with Joseph F. Fraumeni, Jr. as well as others.

== Career and research ==
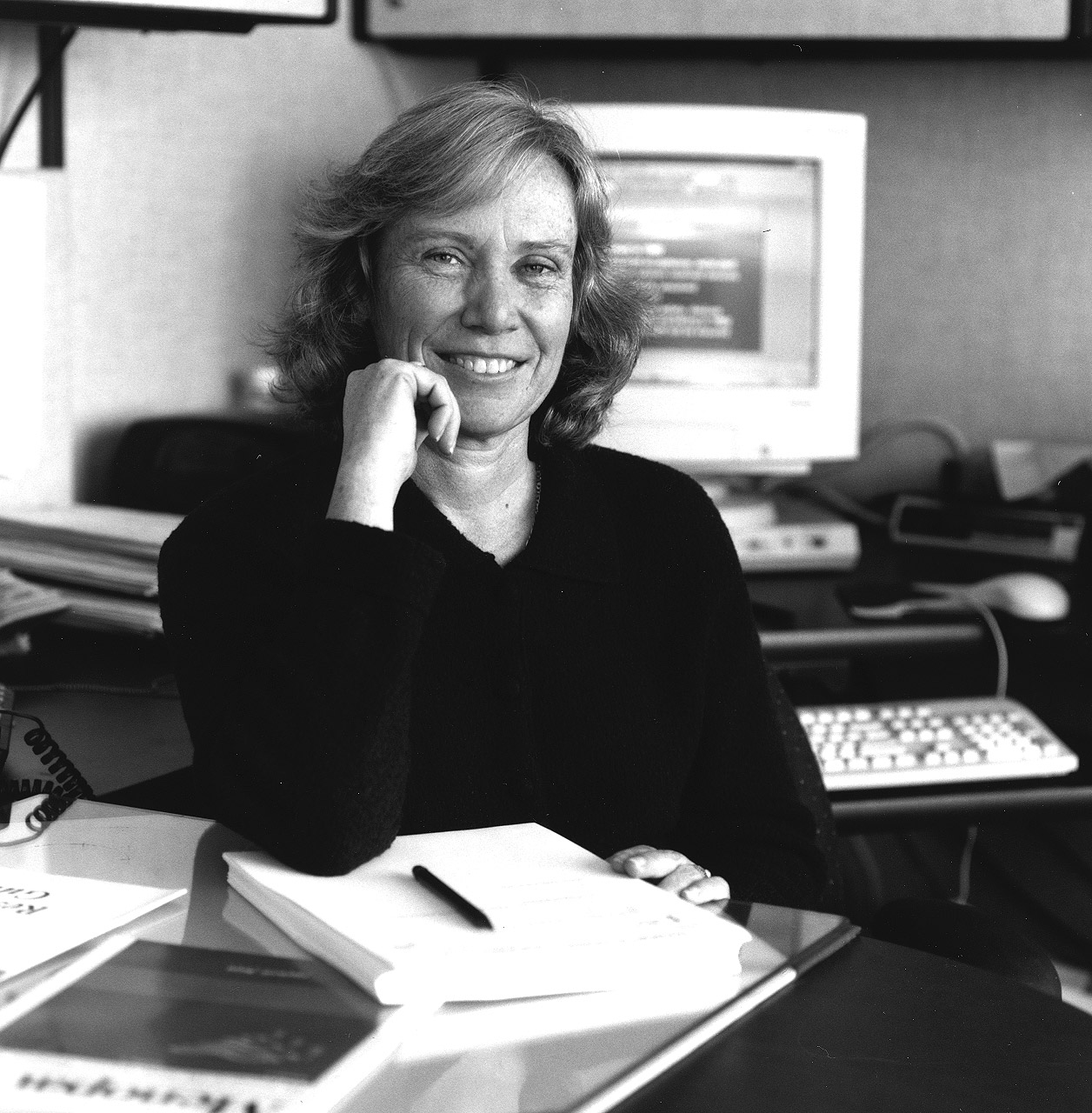
Brinton in October 1997.

In 1984, Brinton was appointed the NCI Acting Chief of the Environmental Studies Section at NCI, and in 1996 became Chief of the Environmental Epidemiology Branch, later renamed the Hormonal and Reproductive Epidemiology Branch (HREB). In 2016, she was named DCEG's first Scientific Advisor for International Activities. She retired from federal service at the end of April 2017.

During her career, Brinton made contributions to advance the health of women in the United States and around the world. The results of these studies have been described in over 700 articles and numerous book chapters. In 2017, when asked which study she is most proud of, Brinton quickly named the Invasive Cervical Cancer Study in Latin America. Women in Latin America experience some of the highest rates of cervical cancer in the world. The team hypothesized that sexual behavior among the men was responsible for the extremely high rates; they designed a study to identify the contribution of male sexual behavior.

== Awards and honors ==
- Fellow, American College of Epidemiology (elected 1983)
- Fellow, American Epidemiologic Society (elected 1987)
- President, Society for Epidemiologic Research (elected 1990)
- PHS (Public Health Service) Special Recognition Award (1993)
- NIH Director's Award for Innovative Leadership in Women's Health Research (1994)
- HA Tyroler Distinguished Alumni Award, University of North Carolina at Chapel Hill (2008)
- American College of Epidemiology's Abraham Lilienfeld Award (2009)
- Society for Epidemiologic Research Career Accomplishment Award (2015)
- Inductee, Johns Hopkins Society of Scholars (2020)
