= The Sentinel (Zion National Park) =

Mountain in the state of Utah

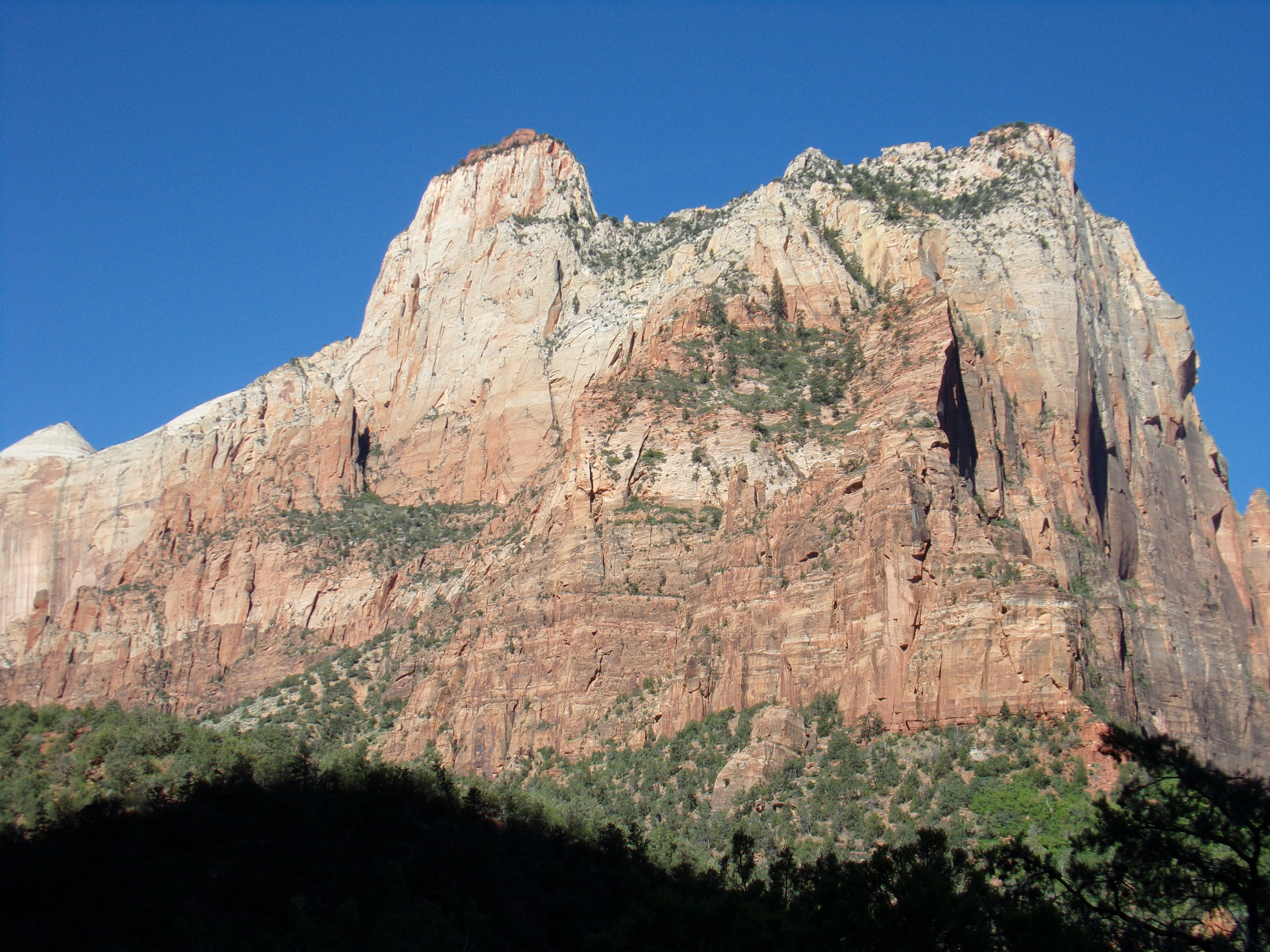
- The Sentinel, northeast aspect, May 2017

Highest point
- Elevation: 7,120 ft (2,170 m)
- Prominence: 400 ft (122 m)
- Parent peak: The East Temple
- Isolation: 0.81 mi (1.30 km)
- Coordinates: 37°13′53″N 112°58′51″W

Geography
- Location within Utah Location within the United States
- Country: United States
- State: Utah
- County: Washington
- Protected area: Zion National Park
- Parent range: Colorado Plateau
- Topo map: USGS Springdale East

Geology
- Rock age: Jurassic
- Rock type: Navajo sandstone

Climbing
- First ascent: 1938 Bob Brinton, Glen Dawson
- Easiest route: class 5 climbing

The Sentinel is a 7,120+ ft (2,170+ m) elevation Navajo Sandstone summit located near the Court of the Patriarchs in Zion National Park, in Washington County of southwest Utah, United States, that is part of the Towers of the Virgin. The national park map lists the elevation as 7,157-feet.

== Description ==
The Sentinel is located 1.5 mi (2.4 km) north of Zion's park headquarters, towering 3,000 feet (910 m) above the park road and the floor of Zion Canyon. It is set alongside the North Fork of the Virgin River which drains precipitation runoff from this mountain. Its neighbors include Bee Hive, Mount Spry, The East Temple, Mount Moroni, Mountain of the Sun, Twin Brothers, and the Three Patriarchs. This feature's name was officially adopted in 1934 by the U.S. Board on Geographic Names. In 1995, a landslide at the base of The Sentinel dammed the Virgin River and washed out a section of the park road. The Sentinel was once much bigger before a huge rock avalanche fell from it, when 4,800 years ago the Sentinel Slide with a volume of 286 million cubic meters (10.1 billion cubic feet) dammed the river, thereby creating Sentinel Lake which existed for 700 years and filled with sediments, creating Zion's flat valley.

== Climate ==
Spring and fall are the most favorable seasons to visit The Sentinel. According to the Köppen climate classification system, it is located in a Cold semi-arid climate zone, which is defined by the coldest month having an average mean temperature below 32 °F (0 °C), and at least 50% of the total annual precipitation being received during the spring and summer. This desert climate receives less than 10 inches (250 millimeters) of annual rainfall, and snowfall is generally light during the winter.

== Gallery ==
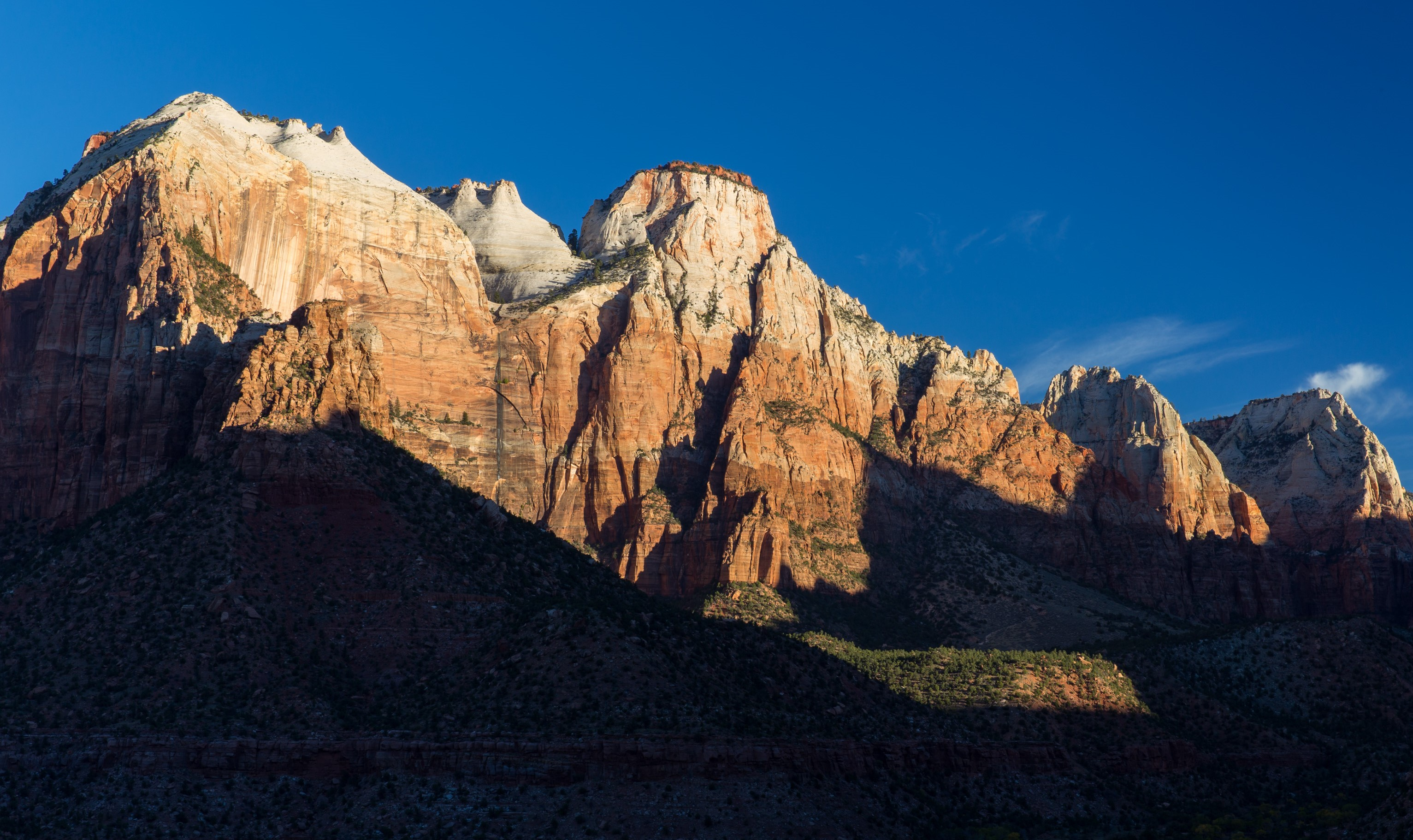
Sunrise on The Sentinel (centered)

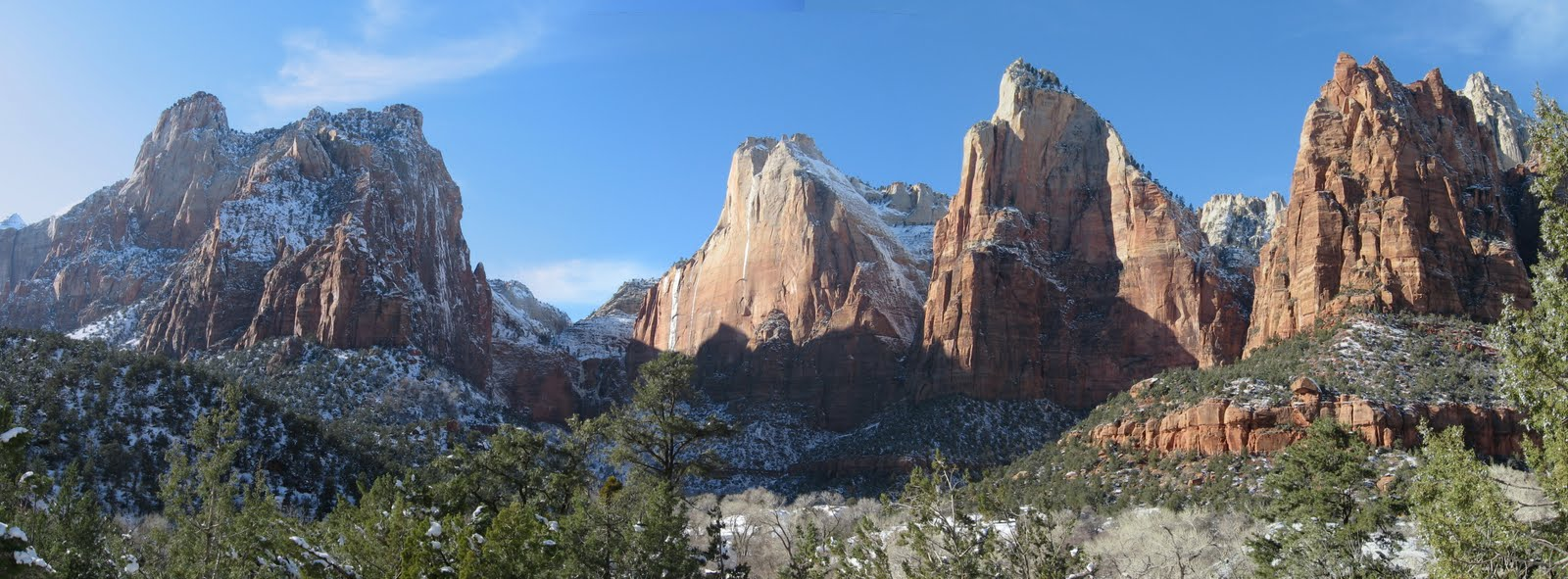
Court of the Patriarchs in winter. Sentinel, Abraham Peak, Isaac, Moroni

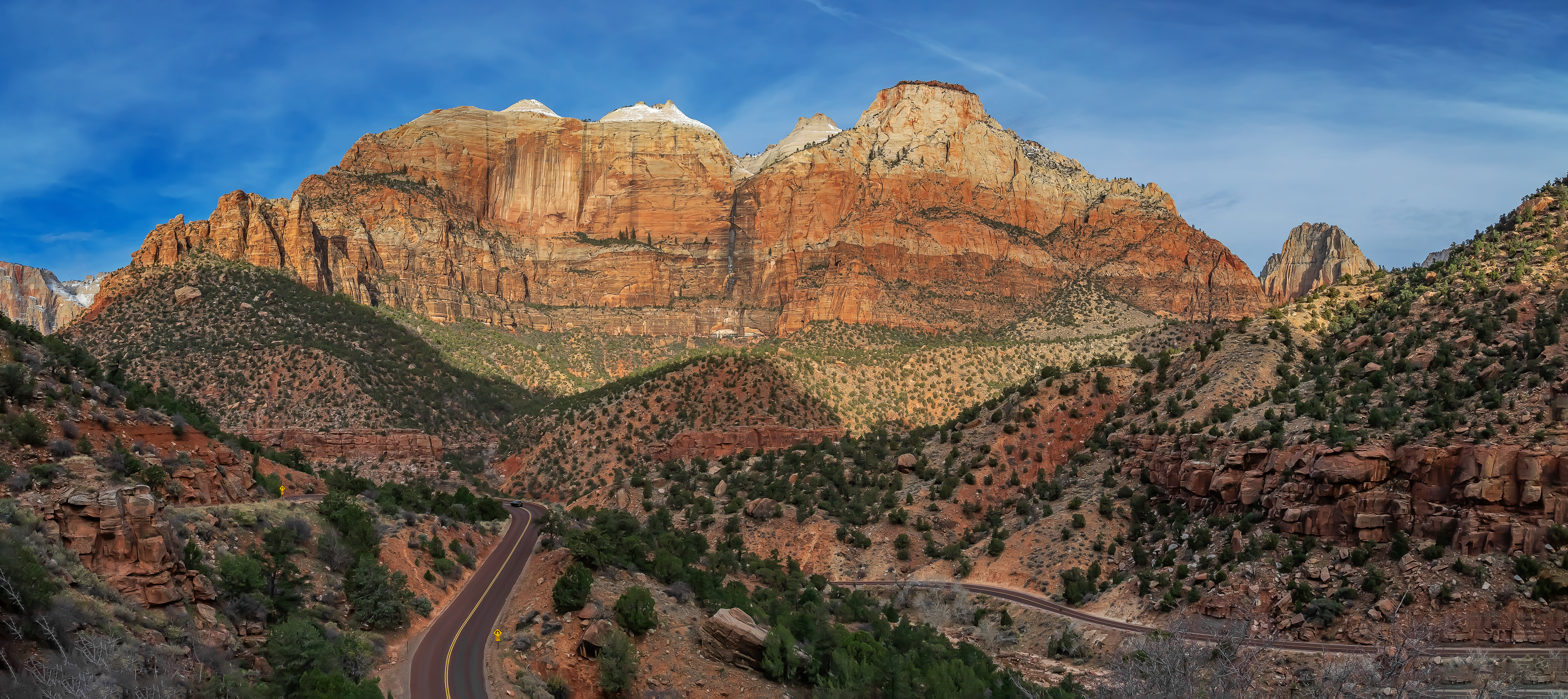
Bee Hive Peak and The Streaked Wall (left), The Sentinel (right)

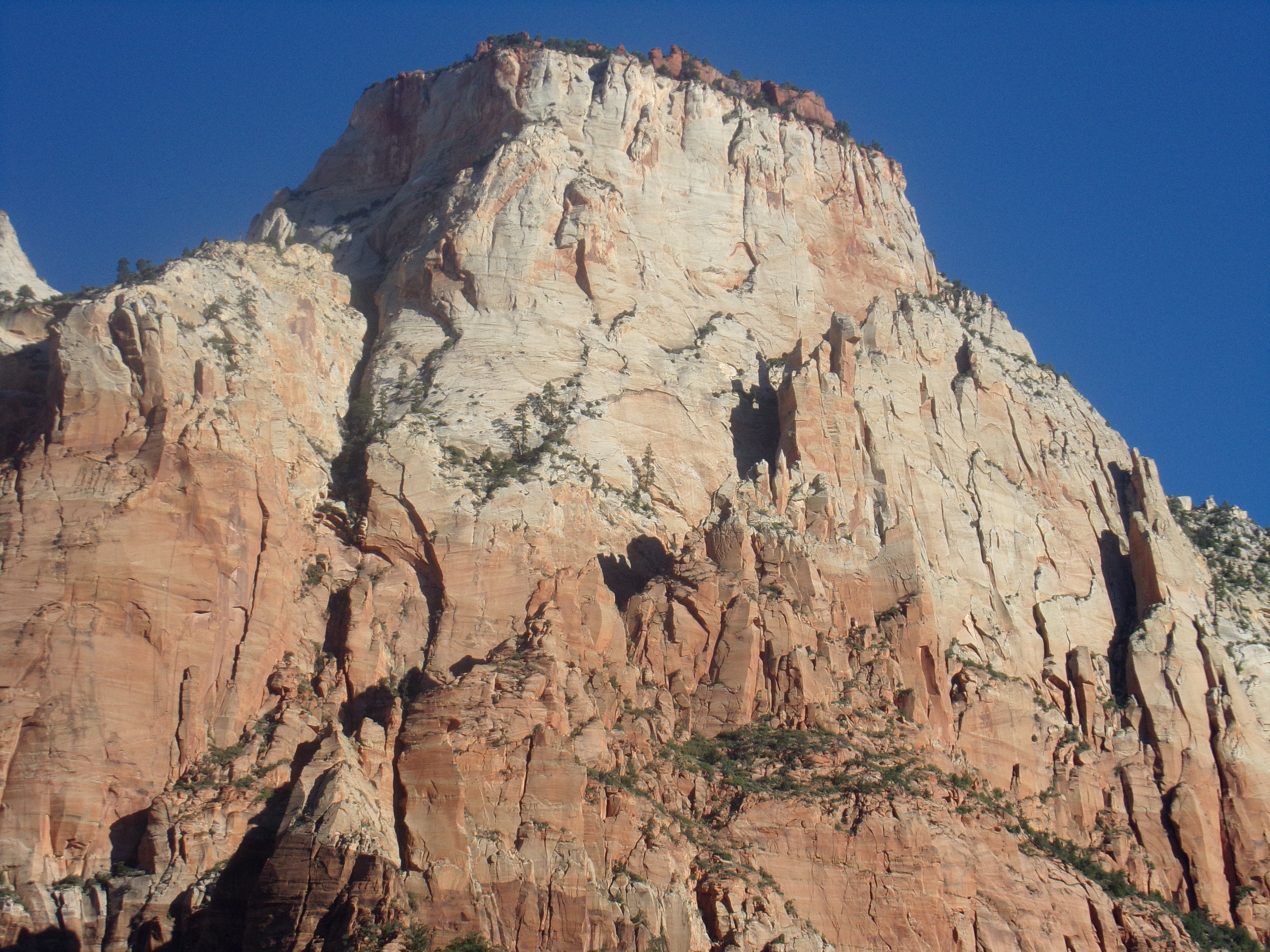
South aspect

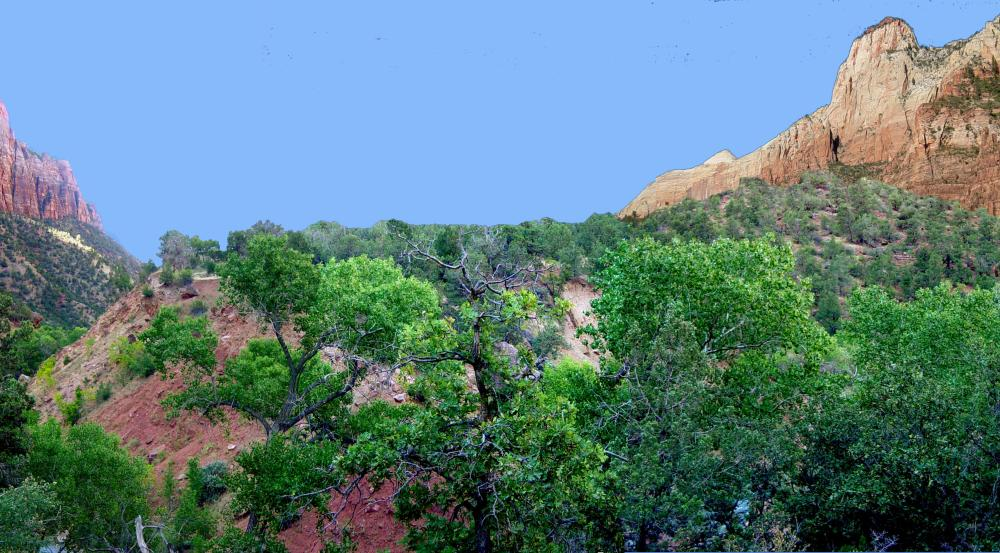
Sentinel Slide

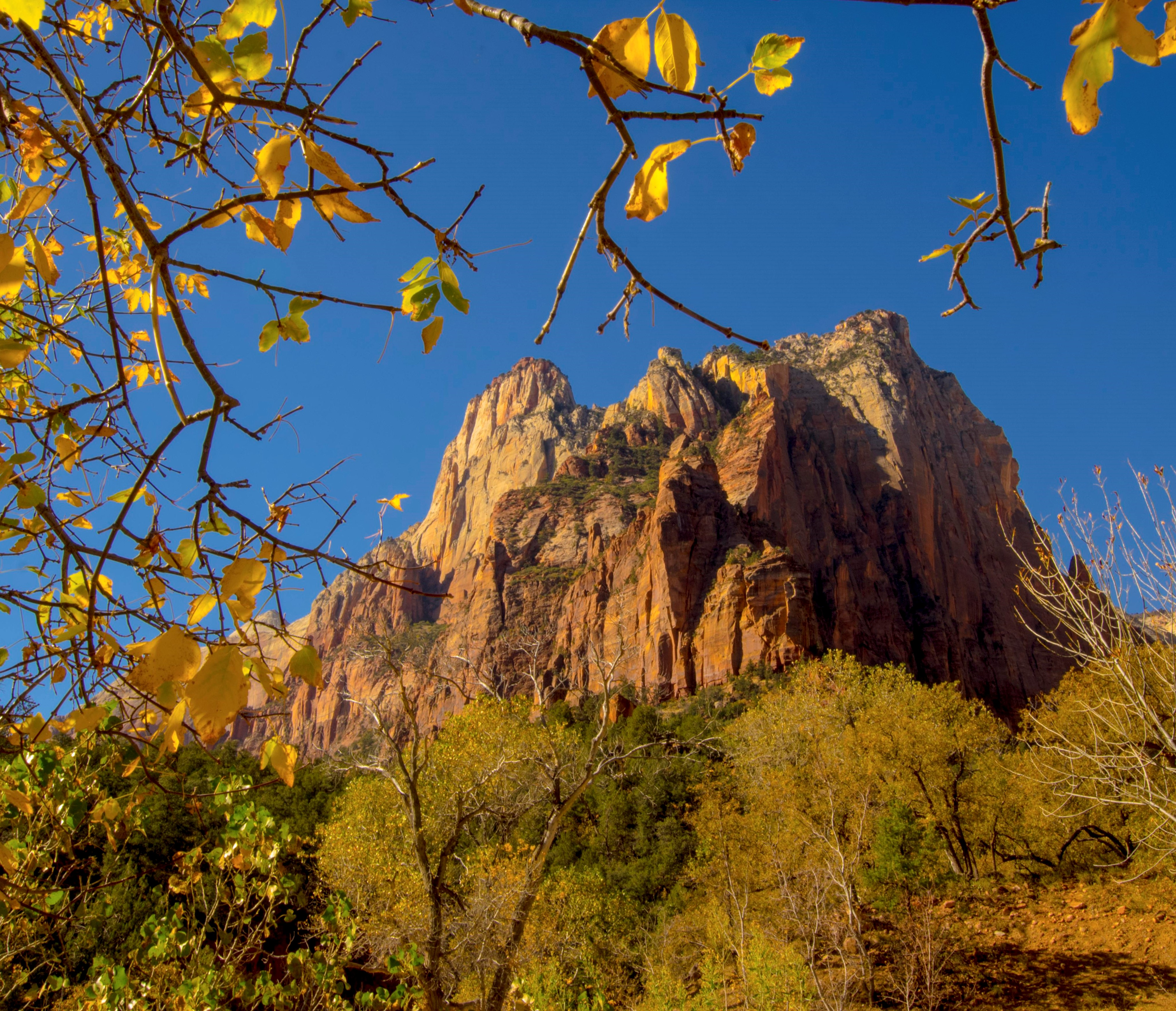
The Sentinel in autumn

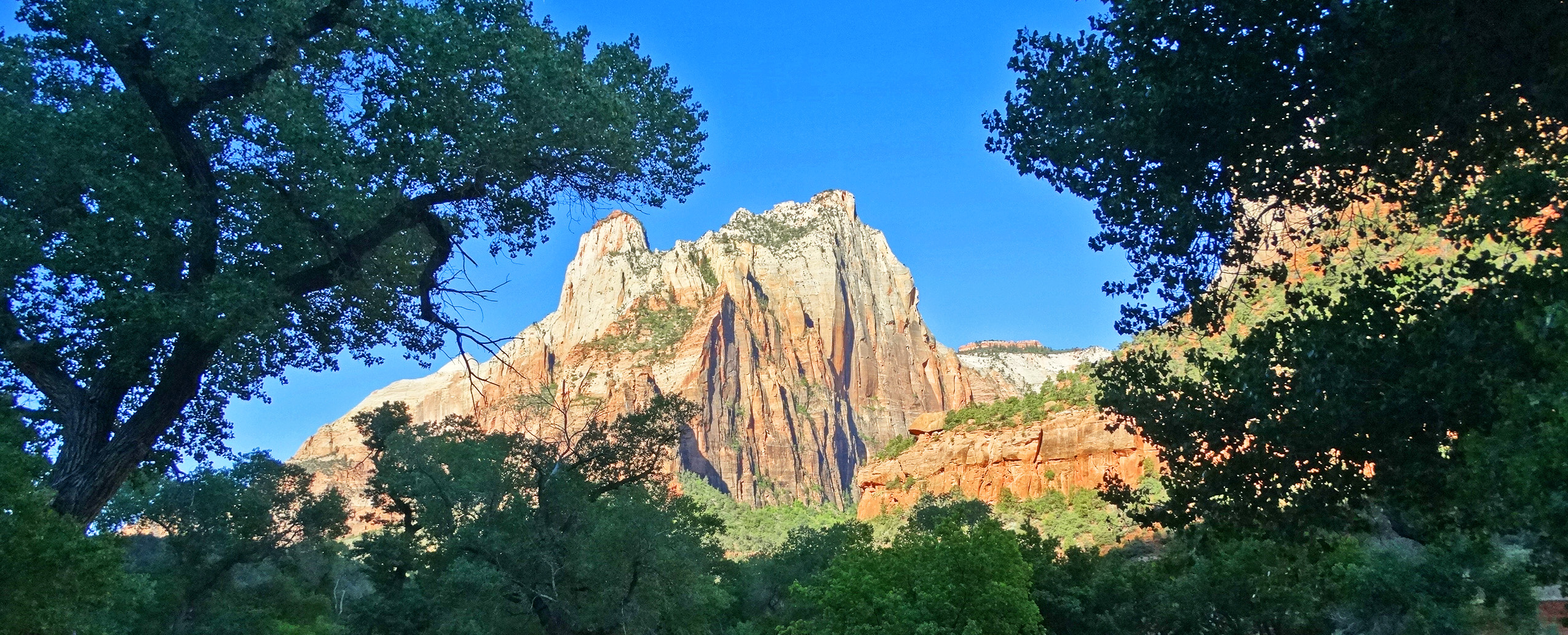
The Sentinel through the Cottonwoods

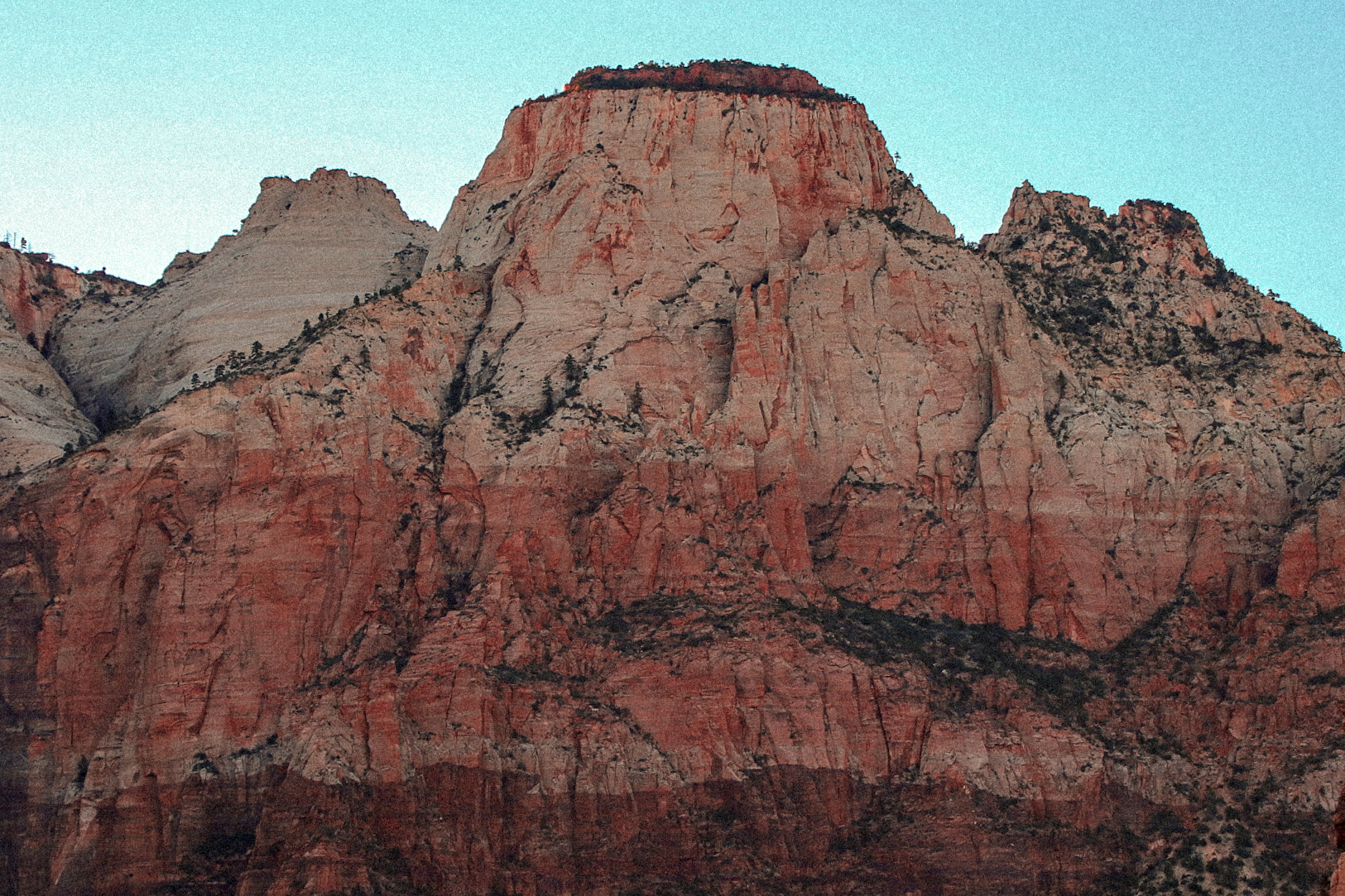

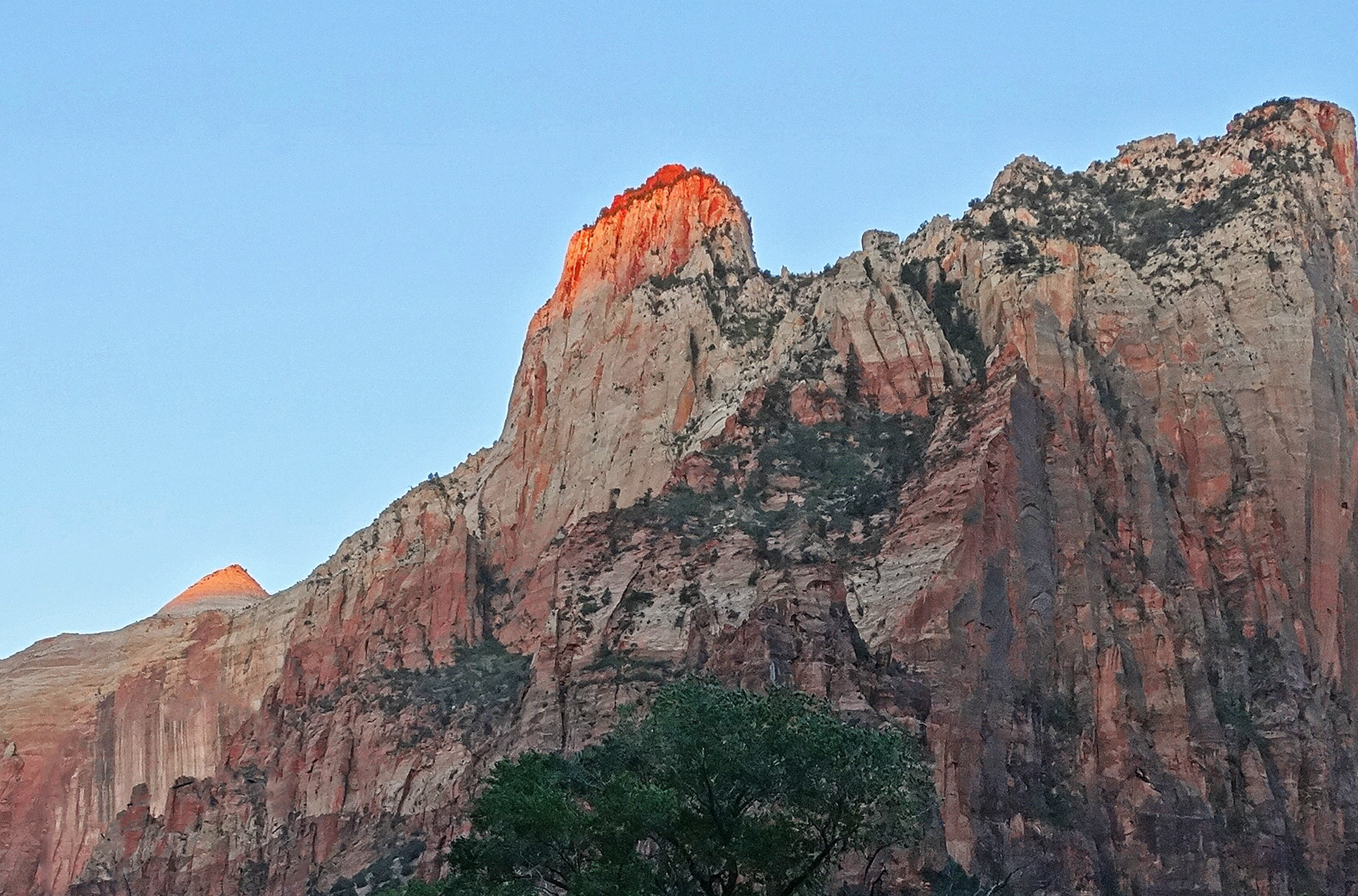
Sunrise. (Bee Hive lower left)

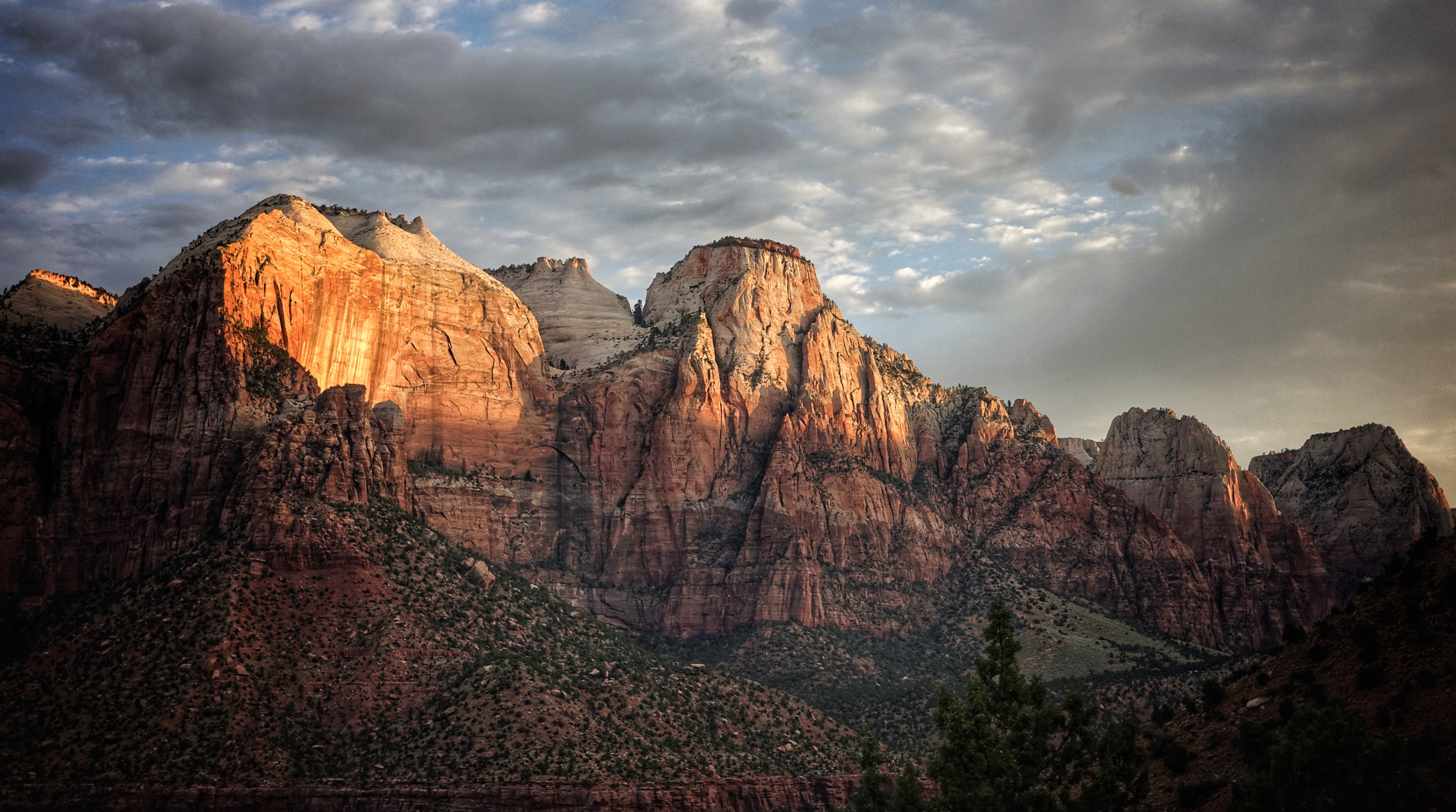
The Sentinel seen from the Watchman Trail

== See also ==
- List of mountains in Utah
- Geology of the Zion and Kolob canyons area
- Colorado Plateau
