= Robert K. Brinton =

American rock climber and ski mountaineer (1915–1996)

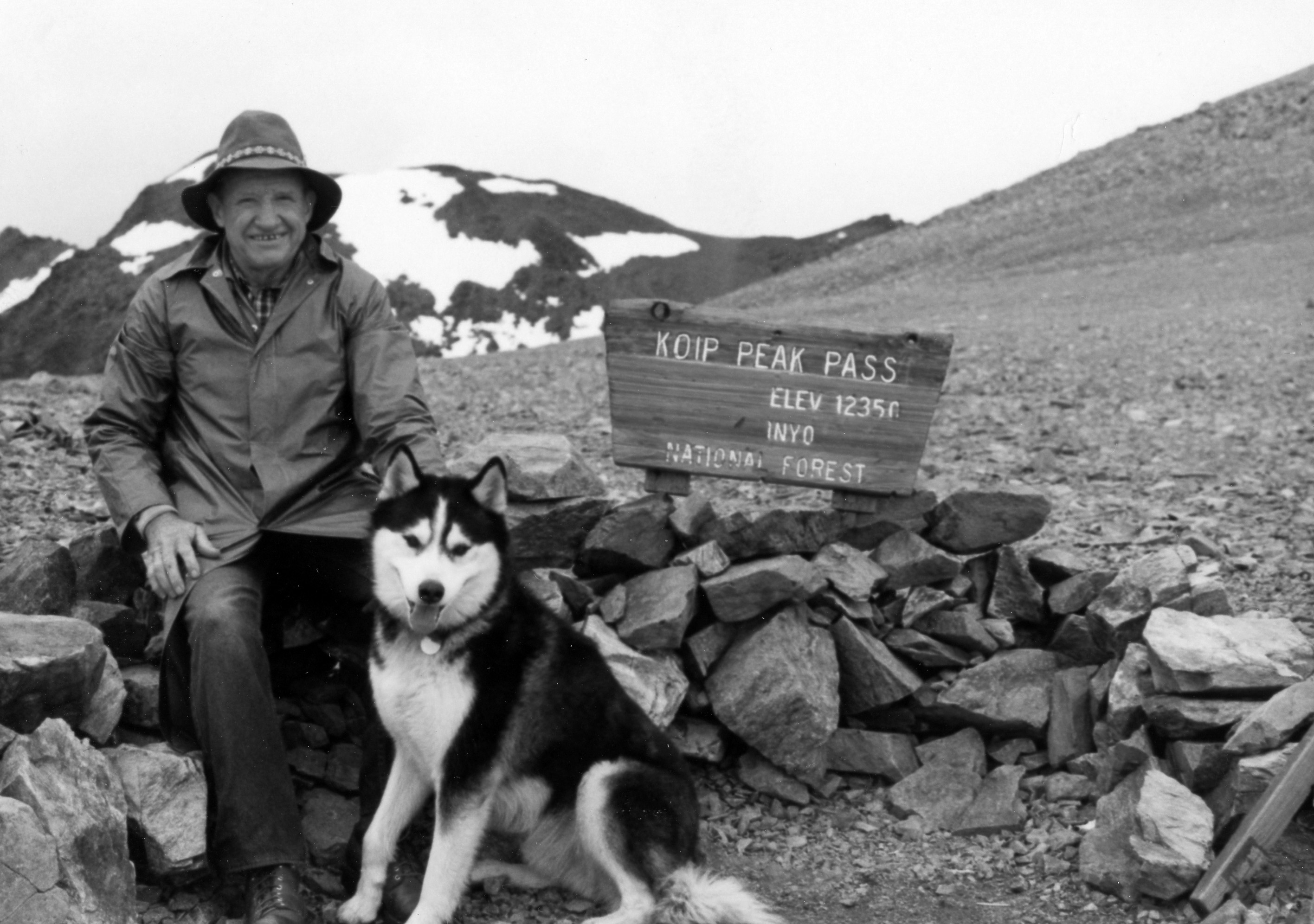
- Brinton and his dog Toki atop Koip Peak Pass, 1983
- Born: January 9, 1915
- Died: December 9, 1996 (aged 81)
- Education: University of California, Los Angeles
- Spouse: Mary Mies (m. 1946)
- Children: Donna, Louise, and Laurel
- Awards: Guggenheim Fellowship (1961)

Robert K. Brinton (January 9, 1915 – December 9, 1996) was a pioneer American rock climber and ski mountaineer. Along with his frequent climbing partner, Glen Dawson, he made numerous first ascents in California, British Columbia, and Utah in the 1930s and named a number of well-known routes.

== Early life ==
As a youth, Brinton became a member of the Trailfinders, an outdoors club for boys. It was here that he met Glen Dawson and his brother Muir. Brinton graduated from Los Angeles High School in 1932. He undertook undergraduate studies at the University of California Los Angeles, receiving a BA in chemistry in 1936. While at UCLA he participated on the ski team under the direction Dr. Walter Mosauer, a ski mountaineering enthusiast.

== Climbing career ==
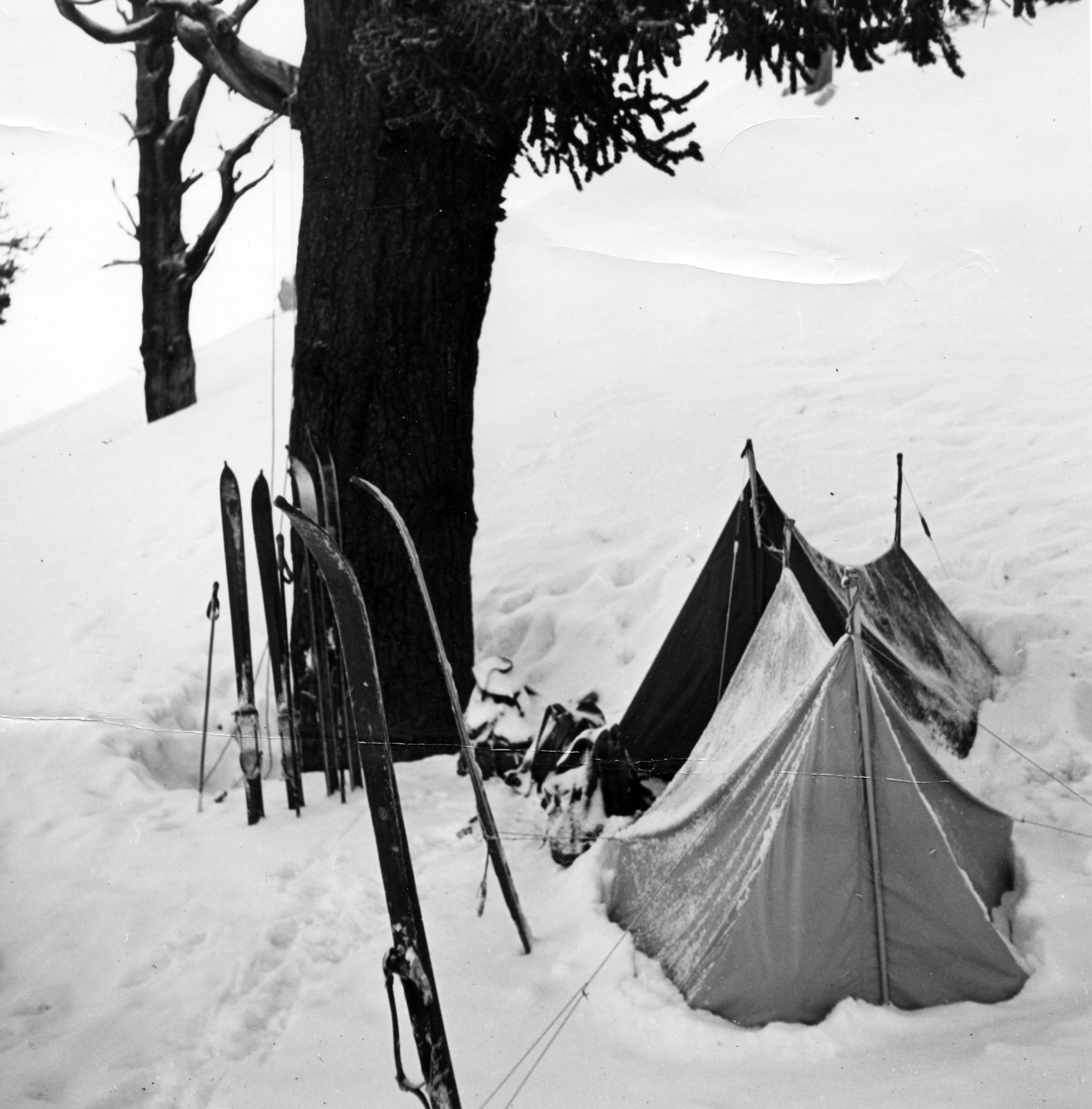
Timberline Base Camp above Crabtree Meadow, April 1938

Brinton's early activities were in conjunction with the Ski Mountaineers section of the Sierra Club Los Angeles chapter, which along with Walter Mosauer and George Bauwens he helped found in 1935. He also named the club's newsletter, The Mugelnoos, which began publication in 1938. In 1936, he made an ascent on skis of Dunderberg Peak with Walter Mosauer during Easter break from UCLA.

After the "discovery" of Tahquitz Rock in the San Jacinto Mountains as a prime area for southern California mountain climbing by James Smith and a scouting committee of the Rock Climbing Section of the Sierra Club Los Angeles chapter, Brinton pioneered and named a number of the classic climbing routes. He followed on the first technical ascent of the rock, via "The Trough" in August 1936 and in September of the same year was one of the first ascensionists of the more difficult "Fingertip Traverse" (class 5.4), along with Jim Smith and Art Johnson on September 19, 1936. It was followed shortly thereafter by "Piton Pooper" (class 5.7+), climbed by Brinton, Art Johnson, Bill Rice, and Jim Smith on August 20, 1936. "The Trough" (class 5.4) was first ascended by Brinton, Jim Smith, and Zene Jasaitis two days later on August 22, 1936. In September 1939, Brinton also made the first ascent of "From Bad Traverse" (class 4) with Homer Fuller. The name for this route is an "unspeakable pun by Bob Brinton". Indeed, all of these routes were named by Brinton, known for his sense of humor; "Angel's Fright" (class 5.6), while not a first ascent by Brinton, was a punning reference to Angels Flight, a funicular railway in downtown Los Angeles. The system for gauging route difficulty for climbs, the Yosemite Decimal System, had its origins in the rating of routes at Tahquitz.

Brinton also climbed in the Sierra Nevadas, with a number of first ascents in the Mt. Whitney region. In August 1936, Brinton established three new routes up Thor Peak. The first was the SE face of Thor Peak from Mirror Point (class 5.0), climbed by Brinton and Bill Rice on August 6 The next day, Brinton, along with Glen Dawson and Bill Rice, established "The Stemwinder" (class 5.4) up the SE Chimney. On the same day, Brinton, Rice, and Dawson also made the first descent of the "West Arête" of Thor Peak (class 2), and they accomplished the first ascent of Pinnacle Pass Needle (class 4). Perhaps the most notable of Brinton's first ascents was of the East Buttress of Mt. Whitney. This route (class 5.7) was pioneered by Brinton, Dick Jones, Muir Dawson, Glen Dawson, and Howard Koster on September 5, 1937, and named the "Sunshine" or "Sunshine-Peewee" route". At the top, the climbers were met by about 100 of their friends, who had climbed up the trail. In a personal letter, Dawson describes this as his "favorite climb". The success of this climb was featured in a front-page article in the Los Angeles Times as well as in an article in the Los Angeles Herald and Express entitled "Triumph of Stout Hearts –LA Youths Climb – To 'Roof of United States'".

In Yosemite, Brinton and Bill Rice made the second ascent of Royal Arches (class 5.9) and Lower Cathedral Spire in May 1937 (and again in 1941). A climb up the North Palisade in July 1938 led to the rescue of three climbers who were unroped and inadequately equipped; after roping the climbers and assisting them to the top, the group spent an unanticipated and cold night on the mountain.

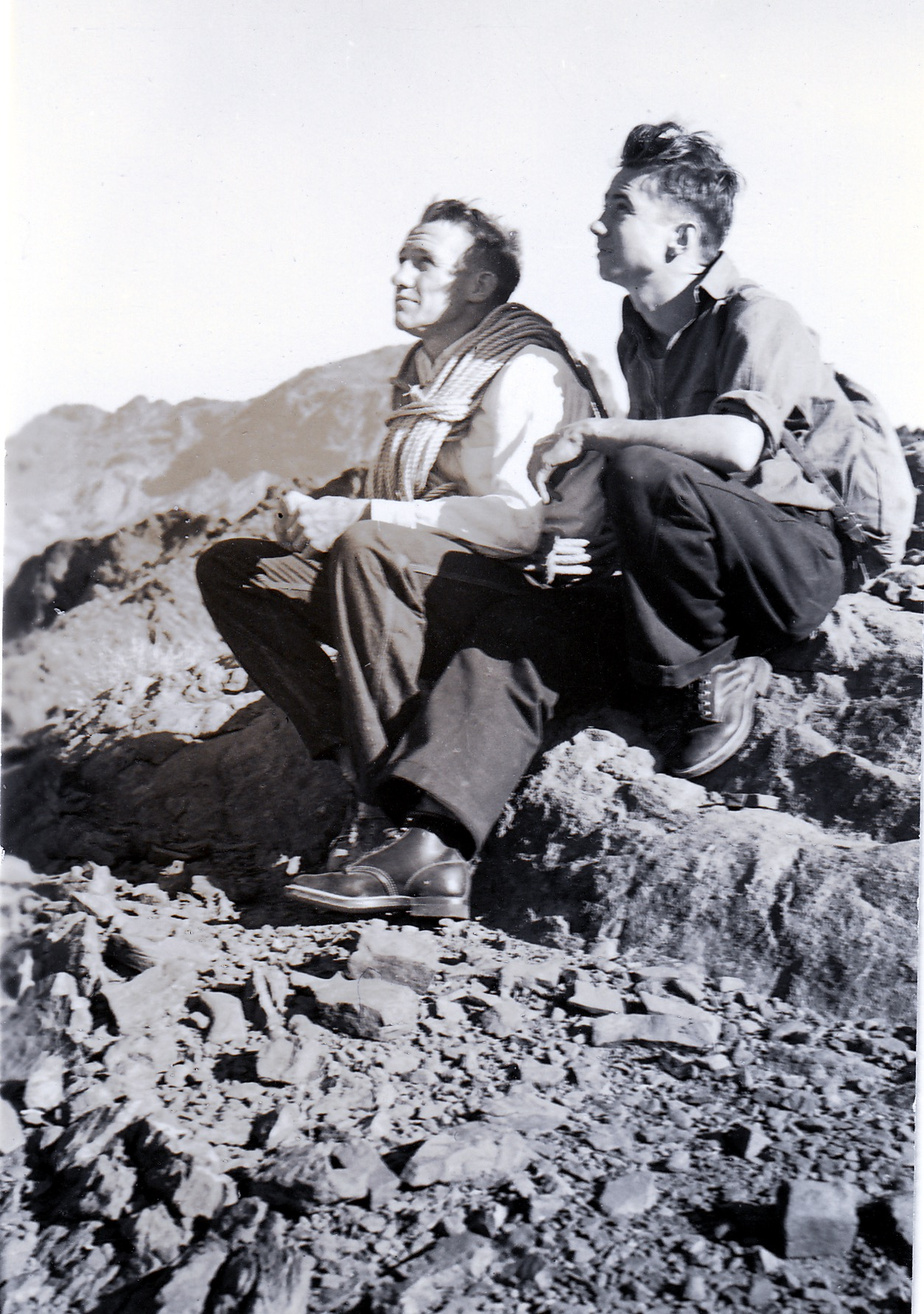
Brinton (l.) and Dawson (r.) on Monument Peak, 1937

Outside California, Brinton made first ascents in Utah, British Columbia, and Wisconsin. Climbing in the southwest attracted Brinton and the early southern California climbers. Unsuccessful attempts to climb Monument Peak in Arizona with Glen Dawson in October 1937 and Shiprock in New Mexico with Glen Dawson and Bill Rice on January 8, 1938, finally led to success on June 5, 1938, when the threesome pioneered a route up the Sentinel in Zion National Park in Utah. In August 1938, Brinton joined a group of climbers who headed north to British Columbia to explore climbing in the Bugaboos in the Purcell Mountains of British Columbia. After an extended period of inclement weather, the group was able to climb the Bugaboo Spire by the Kain Route on August 20. Brinton and Glen Dawson also made the second ascent of Marmalata on August 24, and climbed Pigeon Spire. A first ascent of the West Ridge of Crescent Spire was achieved by Brinton, Homer Fuller and Howard Gates on August 28, 1938. On the way home, the group climbed Mt. Louis and Mt. Victoria in the Canadian Rockies. Finally, during the time that Brinton spent at Northwestern University in the war years (see below), he was associated with the Chicago Mountaineering Club. He made the first ascent of the eponymous Brinton's crack (class 5.6) at Devil's Lake, Wisconsin. It is said that during the first ascent, the renowned climber Fritz Wiessner backed off an attempt and then "Brinton climbed to this high point, devised a traverse, and stamped his name on the classic-of-all-classics at Devil's Lake".

Brinton had a comedic role (uncredited) as "Herman from the Bronx" in the MGM short film "Three on a Rope", written and directed by Willard Vander Veer and narrated by Pete Smith. The movie stars Brinton, LaVere Daniels, Bill Rice, Jim Smith, Howard Koster, and Art Johnson. It was made in 1937 at Stoney Point and Tahquitz Rock. The film includes an introduction to the climbing equipment and techniques of the time and follows two climbing groups. There are numerous staged and a few real falls. At the end of the film, Brinton makes a BASE jump from the top (undoubtedly simulated). The actors were promised an honorarium, but it is unclear whether they ever received one.

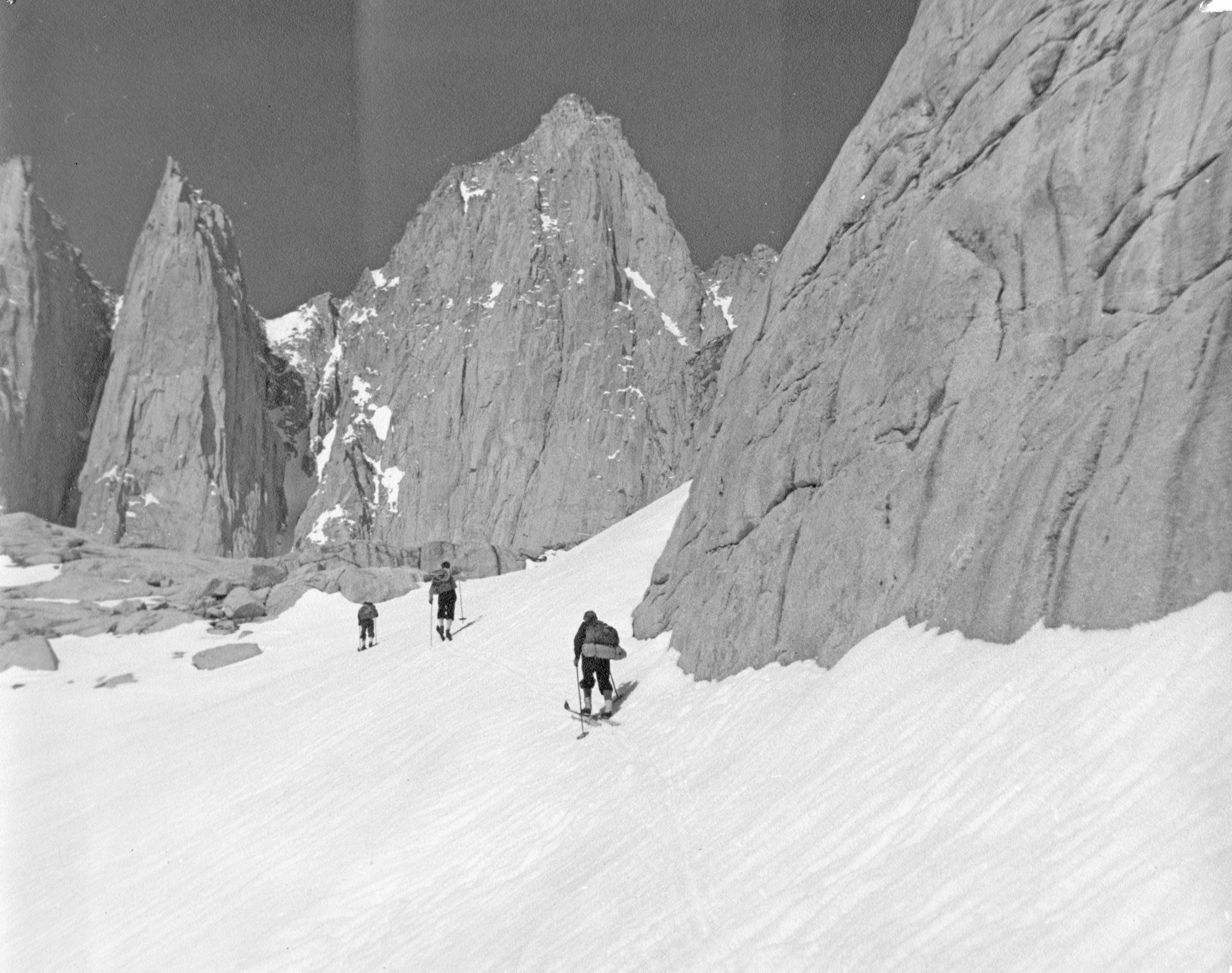
First Winter Crossing by Ski of the Whitney Russell Pass, May 1938

Ski mountaineering continued to be an abiding passion for Brinton. Three trips are particularly noteworthy. In April 1937, Brinton, Muir Dawson, and Dick Jones climbed to Mt. Whitney Pass (13,500') on skis. Then in May 1938, a journey from Whitney Portal to the Upper Kern Canyon and over the Whitney Russell Pass (13,300') was undertaken by Brinton, Howard Koster, Dick Jones, Philip Faulconer, and Glen Dawson. This feat was recognized by the Los Angeles Times: " 'Top of the United States' Crossed for the First Time by Winter Ski Party". And in March 1939, Brinton, Chet Errett, and Lloyd Warner made the first winter ascent of Banner Peak. Again, this achievement is memorialized in the Los Angeles Times: "Three Men on Skis Make First Winter Climb of Sierran Peak". In early 1942, Brinton and Chester L. Errett, with the help of Glen Dawson, held a class at Belmont High School in Los Angeles to recruit members for the 87th Infantry Regiment (United States) of the U.S. Army, and then led a six-week training course.

Brinton was instrumental in the building of the Mt. San Antonio (Mt. Baldy) and Mt. San Gorgornio (Keller Peak) ski huts. The first Mt. Baldy ski hut was built in the fall of 1935; it involved the human transport of all building materials from 7100' to 8300' on a three-mile trail. The original hut was destroyed by fire in September 1936, but was rebuilt that fall and still stands today. In 1938, a windmill, designed by Brinton to provide electricity to the hut, was erected; unfortunately, it never worked and came to be known as "Brinton's folly". The Keller Peak ski hut at San Gorgonio was built by members of the Sierra Club Ski Mountaineers under the supervision of George Bauwens in the summer and fall of 1938, with an annex added in 1939. Again, it is still in use today.

Brinton gave up climbing following the death of his frequent climbing partners, William Rice and Dr. Clyde Nelson, in an accident on the Grand Teton in Wyoming in June 1942. But he continued to be an active hiker, skier, and ski mountaineer. Brinton was elected to the American Alpine Club in 1984.

== Wartime work and professional career ==
After completing an MA degree in chemistry at UCLA in 1938, Brinton worked for General Petroleum Corporation from 1937 to 1942.

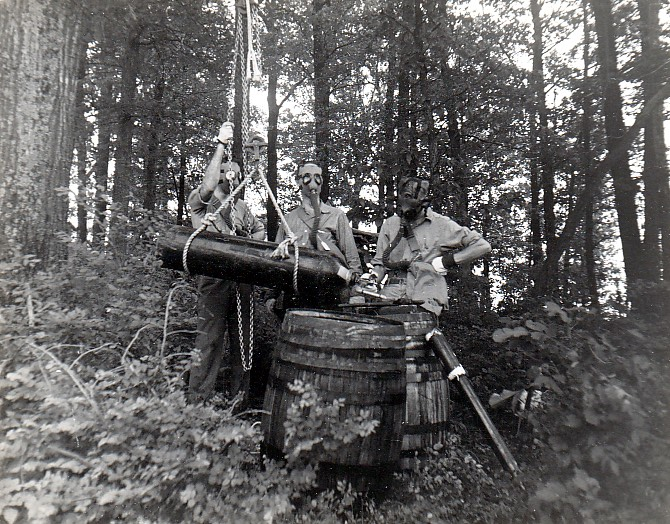
Testing Gask Masks During World War II

From 1942 to 1945, Brinton was employed by Division 10 of the National Defense Research Committee (Office of Scientific Research and Development) at the Northwestern Technological Institute, Evanston, Illinois, under W. Albert Noyes Jr., participating in chemical warfare civilian research. Early work was concerned with the absorption properties of charcoal for various gases, and under the direction of Dr. Francis Blacet, this led to the development of an improved gas mask, work for which Blacet received the President's Certificate of Merit in 1948 from President Truman. Later wartime work focused on the distribution pattern of various non-persistent war gases under actual field conditions, with testing in Kentucky, Florida, Panama; at the end of the war, Brinton served as a technical field observer in the Southwest Pacific Area (Australia, New Guinea, Philippines).

After the war, Brinton returned to UCLA, receiving his PhD in chemistry in 1948. Here he was instrumental in getting the mass spectrometer "assembled and up and running" and became one of the "new generation of photochemists". Brinton began his professorial career at the University of California, Davis, in 1948; his research focused of photochemistry and chemical kinetics, and he had a special expertise in laboratory design (glass blowing, machining, and electronics). During his tenure at UC Davis, Brinton held a National Research Council of Canada Fellowship during 1954–55, received a Guggenheim fellowship to study at the "Laboratorium für Physikalische Chemie" at the University of Stuttgart, Germany in 1961–62, and spent a sabbatical year at the University of Cambridge from 1971 to 1972. He retired from UC Davis in July 1978.

== Personal life ==
After a brief first marriage, Brinton married Mary Mies on January 9, 1946, a fellow member of the Ski Mountaineers. They continued to hike, ski, and camp; they traveled widely from Patagonia to Greenland to Indonesia. They are survived by three daughters, Donna M. Brinton, Louise A. Brinton, and Laurel J. Brinton.

== See also ==
- List of Guggenheim Fellowships awarded in 1961
