= Donna M. Brinton =

American applied linguist, author

- Born: July 11, 1948 (age 77); Los Angeles County, California, USA
- Education: University of California, Berkeley; Purdue University; University of California, Los Angeles
- Father: Robert K. Brinton
- Relatives: Louise Brinton (sister); Laurel Brinton (sister)

Donna Mary Brinton (born July 11, 1948 in Los Angeles County, California) is an American applied linguist, author, and global educational consultant on second language education. She is the daughter of Mary Mies Brinton and Robert K. Brinton and the sister of epidemiologist Louise A. Brinton and linguist Laurel J. Brinton.

== Academic career ==
Brinton graduated with dual B.A. degrees in Comparative Literature and German Language and Literature from the University of California, Berkeley (1970). Subsequent to this, she completed M.A. degrees in German from Purdue University in 1972 and in Teaching English to Speakers of Other Languages (TESOL) at the University of California, Los Angeles in 1981. Her early career in English as a second or foreign language (ESL/EFL) took place in Germany from 1972-1976.

For the bulk of her academic career, Brinton worked at the University of California, Los Angeles in a variety of positions, including Associate Director of the UCLA Center for World Languages, Lecturer in Applied Linguistics, and Academic Coordinator of the UCLA ESL Service Courses. She later worked as Professor of TESOL at Soka University of America and as Senior Lecturer in the Rossier School of Education at the University of Southern California (USC) designing and teaching online classes in the MAT-TESOL program.

In addition to teaching numerous applied linguistics and TESOL classes, Brinton is an author of books and articles in the field as well as frequent presenter at national and international conferences. She has made a name for herself in the areas of second language pronunciation pedagogy, content-based instruction (CBI), and general TESOL methodology. She is also known to the wider applied linguistics community as a long-term editor of The CATESOL Journal, a publication of the California Association of Teachers of English to Speakers to Other Languages. To pre-service teachers, she is most widely known for her teacher reference texts, the 2010 Teaching Pronunciation: A Reference and Course Text (2nd. ed., with others), the 2014 Teaching English as a Second or Foreign Language (4th ed., with others) and the 2017 Content-based Classroom (2nd ed., with Marguerite Ann Snow).

Several of her works highlight an approach to language teaching known as content-based instruction (CBI), in which the new language is the medium of instruction, so that the language and content are taught simultaneously. This takes advantage of the connectedness of the form and function of language.

== Women in linguistics ==
Brinton is among the first generation of female applied linguists that came to the fore in significant numbers, having been academically socialized in the 1970s. While women were working in the field earlier than the 1970s, her generation was really the first to tip the balance more favorably for women.

== International work ==
As a TESOL teacher educator and educational consultant, Brinton has worked across the globe, often as a U.S. Department of State English language specialist, assigned to such locations as Qatar, the U.A.E., Bahrain, Afghanistan, Iraq, Nepal, India, the Philippines, China, Thailand, Vietnam, Laos, Myanmar, Singapore, the Republic of South Korea, Taiwan, Canada, Mexico, Guatemala, Bolivia, Argentina, Chile, Brazil, Colombia, Paraguay, Greece, Turkey, Israel, Morocco, Tunisia, Libya, Algeria, South Africa, Mozambique, Madagascar, Mauritius, Senegal, Mali, Turkmenistan, Uzbekistan, Kazakhstan, Kyrgyzstan, Armenia, Syria, Lebanon, Curaçao, and as a visiting faculty member at Chulalongkorn University in Thailand and Toyo University, Kanda University, and Soka University in Japan.

== Selected works ==
- Snow, M. A., & Brinton, D. M. 2019. Content-based instruction: What every ESL teacher needs to know. University of Michigan Press. ISBN 9780472126170.
- Snow, M. A., & Brinton, D. M. (Eds.). 2017. The content-based classroom. University of Michigan Press. ISBN 9780472036455.
- Brinton, D. M., Kagan, O., & Bauckus, S. (Eds.). 2017. Heritage language education: A new field emerging. Routledge. ISBN 9780415995887.
- Celce-Murcia, M., Brinton, D. M., & Snow, M. A. (Eds.). 2013. Teaching English as a second or foreign language (4th ed.). Cengage / National Geographic Learning. ISBN 978-1111351694.
- Celce-Murcia, M., Brinton, D. M., & Goodwin, J. M. 2010. Teaching pronunciation: A reference and course text (2nd ed.). Cambridge University Press. ISBN 978-0521729765.
- Brinton, L. J., & Brinton, D. M. 2010. The linguistic structure of modern English (2nd ed.). John Benjamins. ISBN 978-9027211729.
- Brinton, D. M., Snow, M. A., & Wesche, M. B. 2003. Content-based second language instruction (classics ed.). University of Michigan Press. ISBN 978-0472089178.
