= Thor Peak (California) =

Mountain in the American state of California

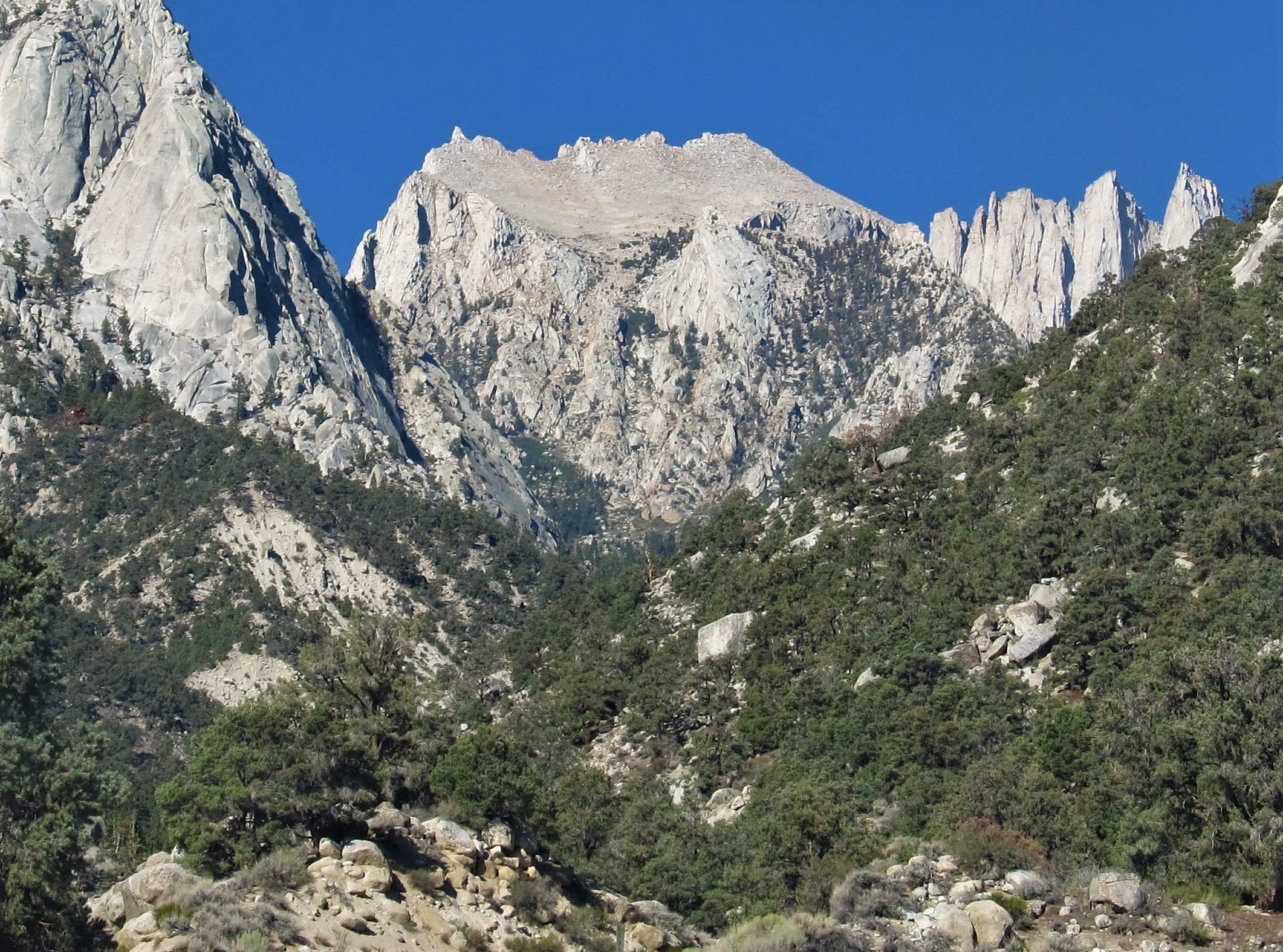
- East aspect, from Whitney Portal Road

Highest point
- Elevation: 12,306 ft (3,751 m)
- Prominence: 265 ft (81 m)
- Parent peak: Mount Whitney (14,494 ft)
- Isolation: 1.04 mi (1.67 km)
- Listing: Sierra Peaks Section
- Coordinates: 36°34′37″N 118°15′57″W

Geography
- Location within California Location within the United States
- Location: Inyo County, California, U.S.
- Parent range: Sierra Nevada
- Topo map: USGS Mount Whitney

Geology
- Rock age: Cretaceous
- Mountain type: Fault block
- Rock type: granitic

Climbing
- First ascent: Norman Clyde
- Easiest route: class 2 Southwest side

Thor Peak is a 12,306-foot-elevation (3,751-meter) mountain summit located east of the crest of the Sierra Nevada mountain range in Inyo County, California. It is situated in the John Muir Wilderness on land managed by Inyo National Forest. It is 12.5 miles (20.1 km) west of the community of Lone Pine, and 1.5 miles (2.4 km) east of Mount Whitney. Topographic relief is significant as it rises 3,937 feet (1,200 meters) above Whitney Portal in 1.5 mile. Hikers on the Mount Whitney Trail pass below the impressive south face of the peak.

== Climate ==
According to the Köppen climate classification system, Thor Peak has an alpine climate. Most weather fronts originate in the Pacific Ocean, and travel east toward the Sierra Nevada mountains. As fronts approach, they are forced upward by the peaks, causing them to drop their moisture in the form of rain or snowfall onto the range (orographic lift). Precipitation runoff from this mountain drains east to Owens Valley via Lone Pine Creek.

== Climbing ==
The first ascent of the summit was made by Norman Clyde, date unknown.

Established rock climbing routes:

- Southwest side – class 1-2 – First ascent by Norman Clyde
- West Arête – class 2
- Southeast chimney, aka Stemwinder – class 5.4 – FA 1936, by Glen Dawson, Robert K. Brinton, William Rice
- South face – class 5 – FA 1937, by Howard Koster, Arthur B. Johnson, James N. Smith
- Odin’s Wrath – class 5.10d

== Gallery ==
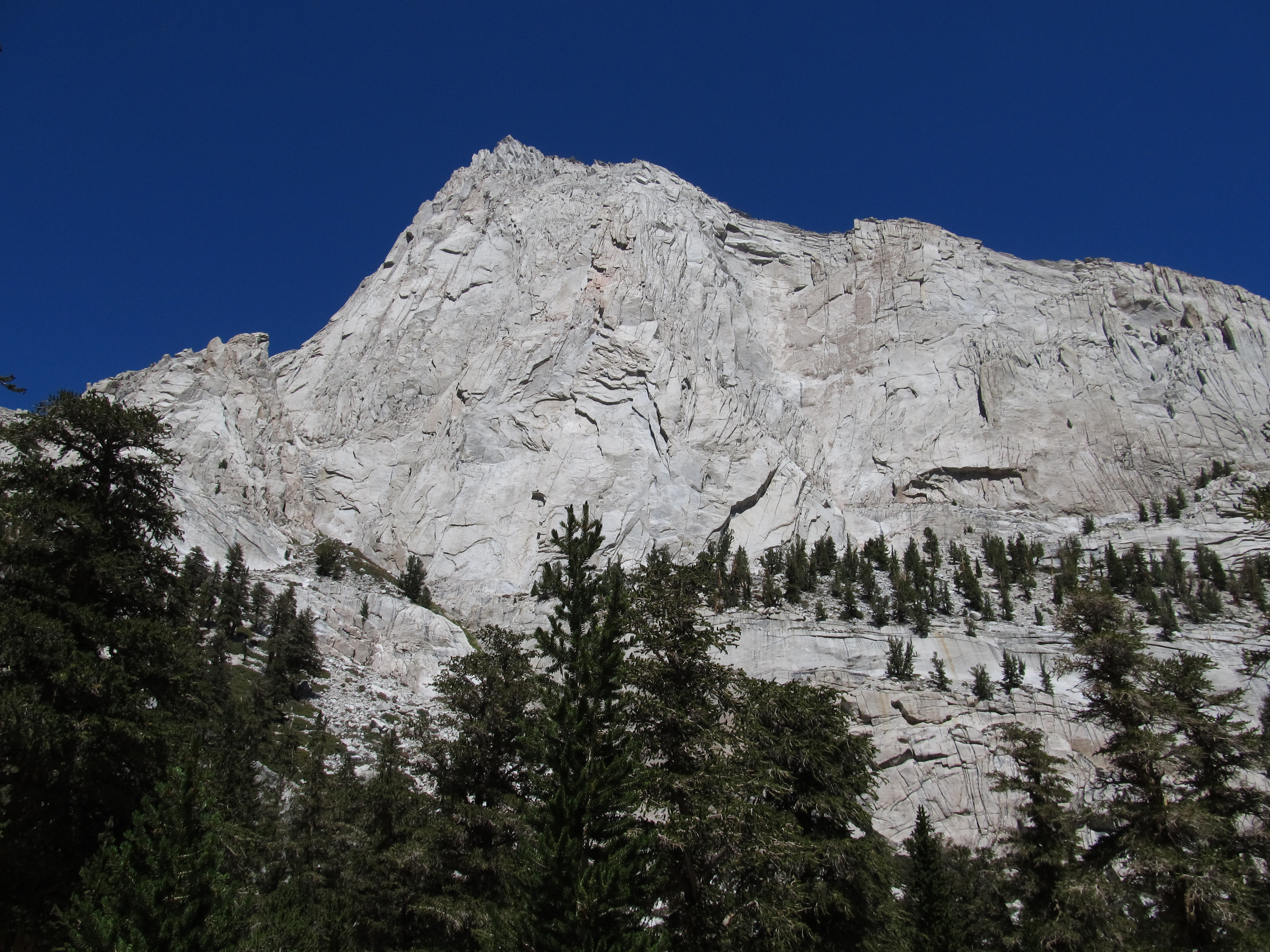
Thor Peak seen from Outpost Camp along Mt. Whitney Trail

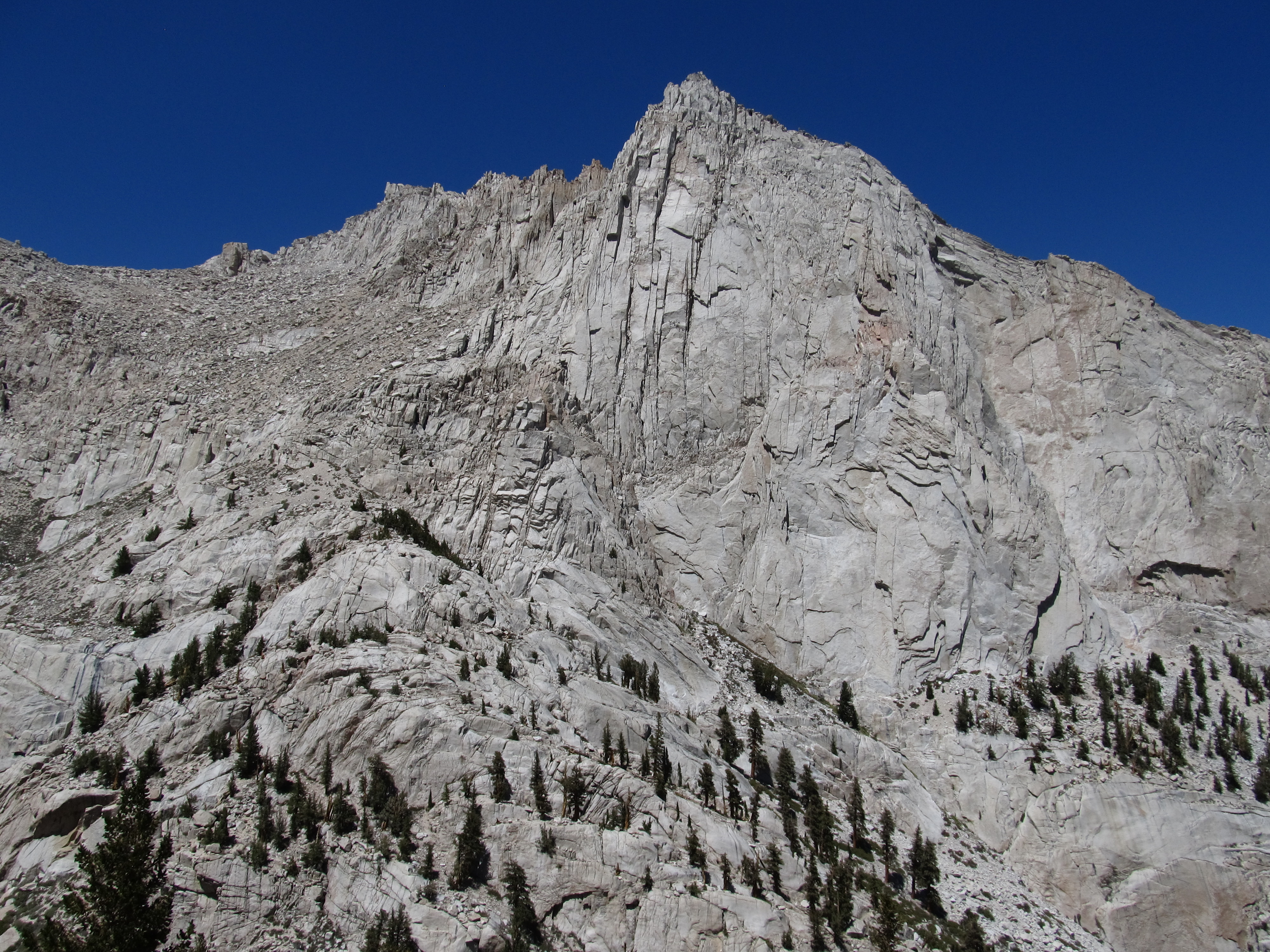
South aspect

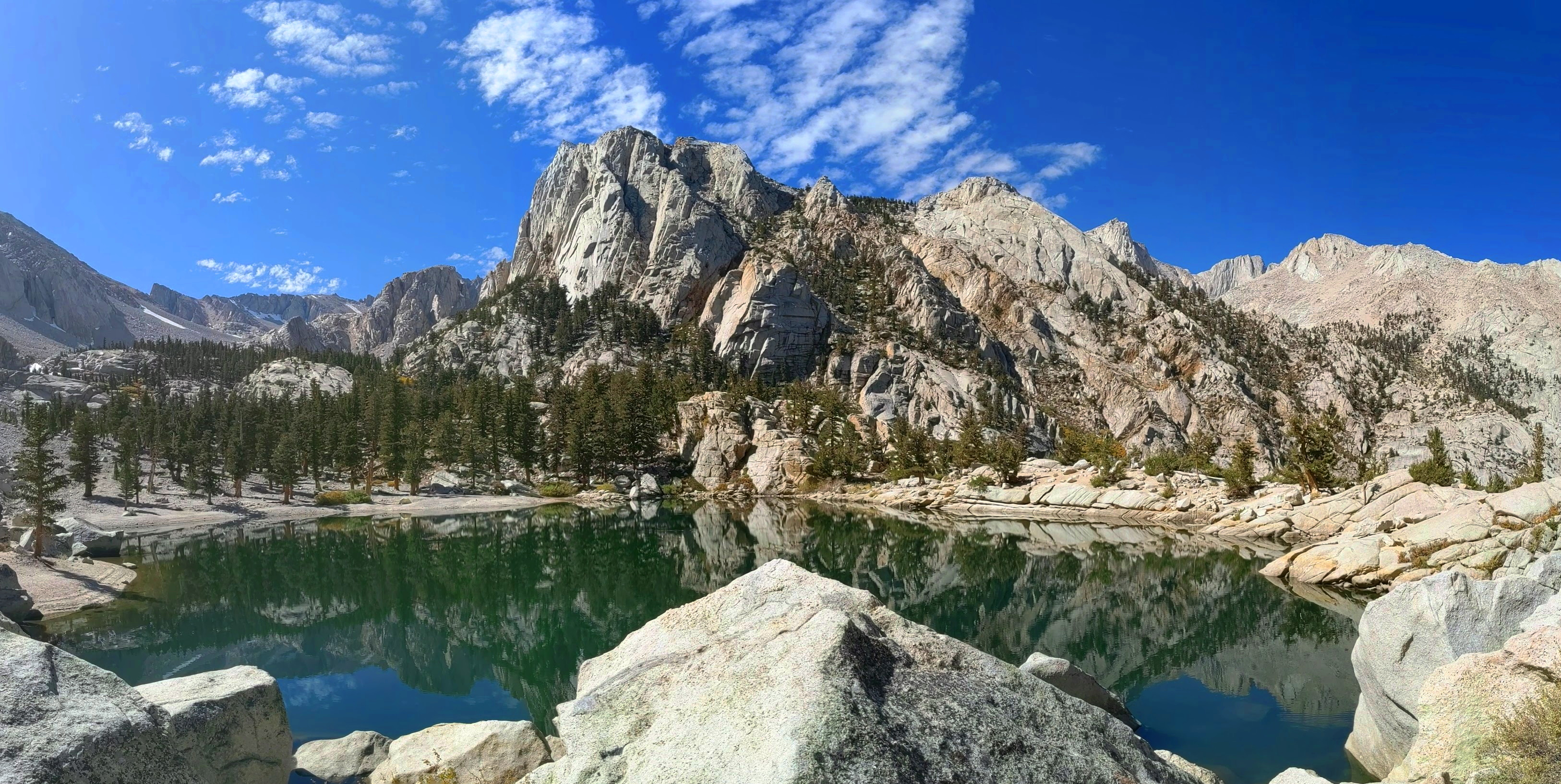
Thor Peak from Lone Pine Lake along Mt. Whitney Trail

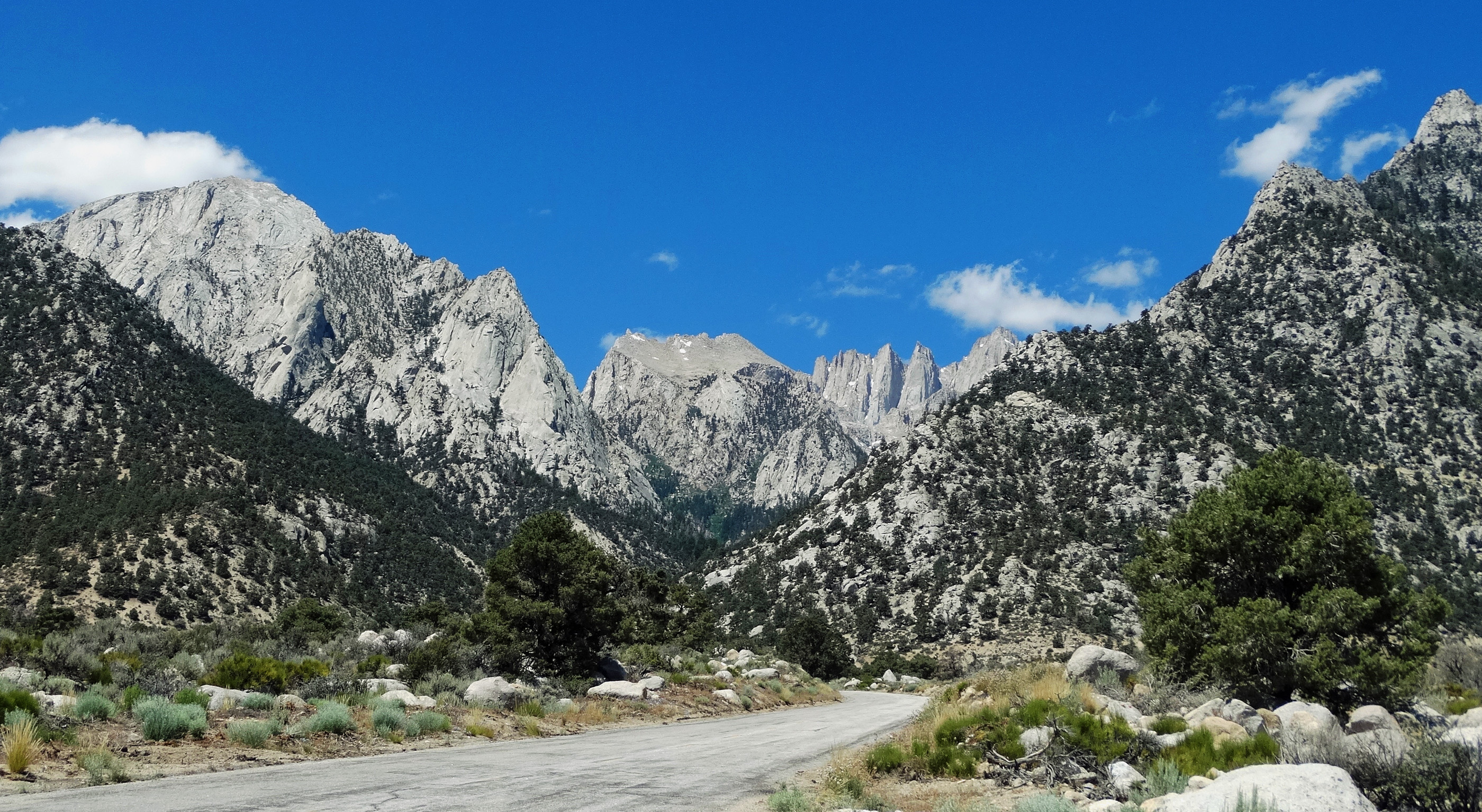
Thor Peak (center) from Whitney Portal Road

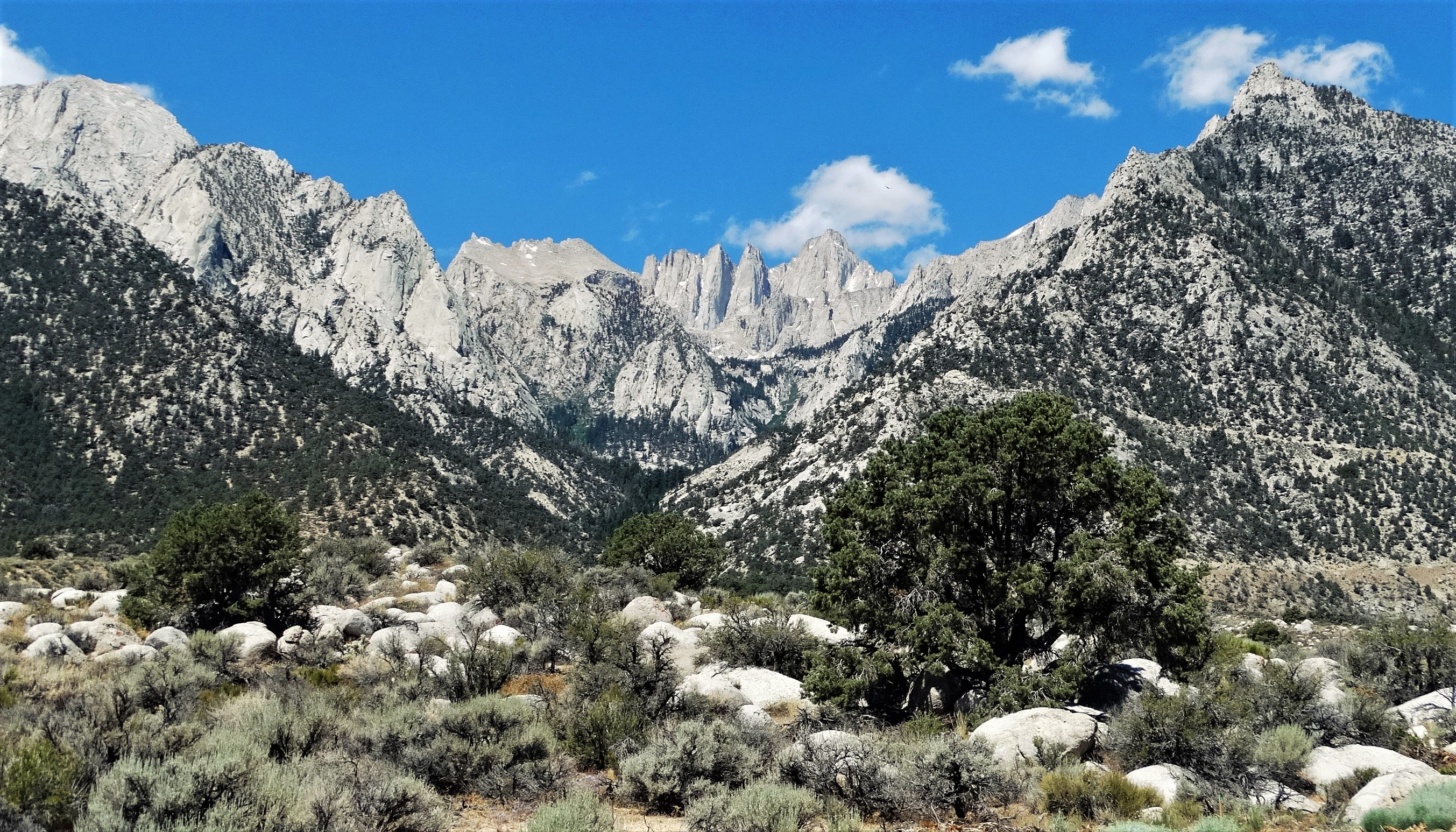
Thor Peak (left of center) with Mt. Whitney

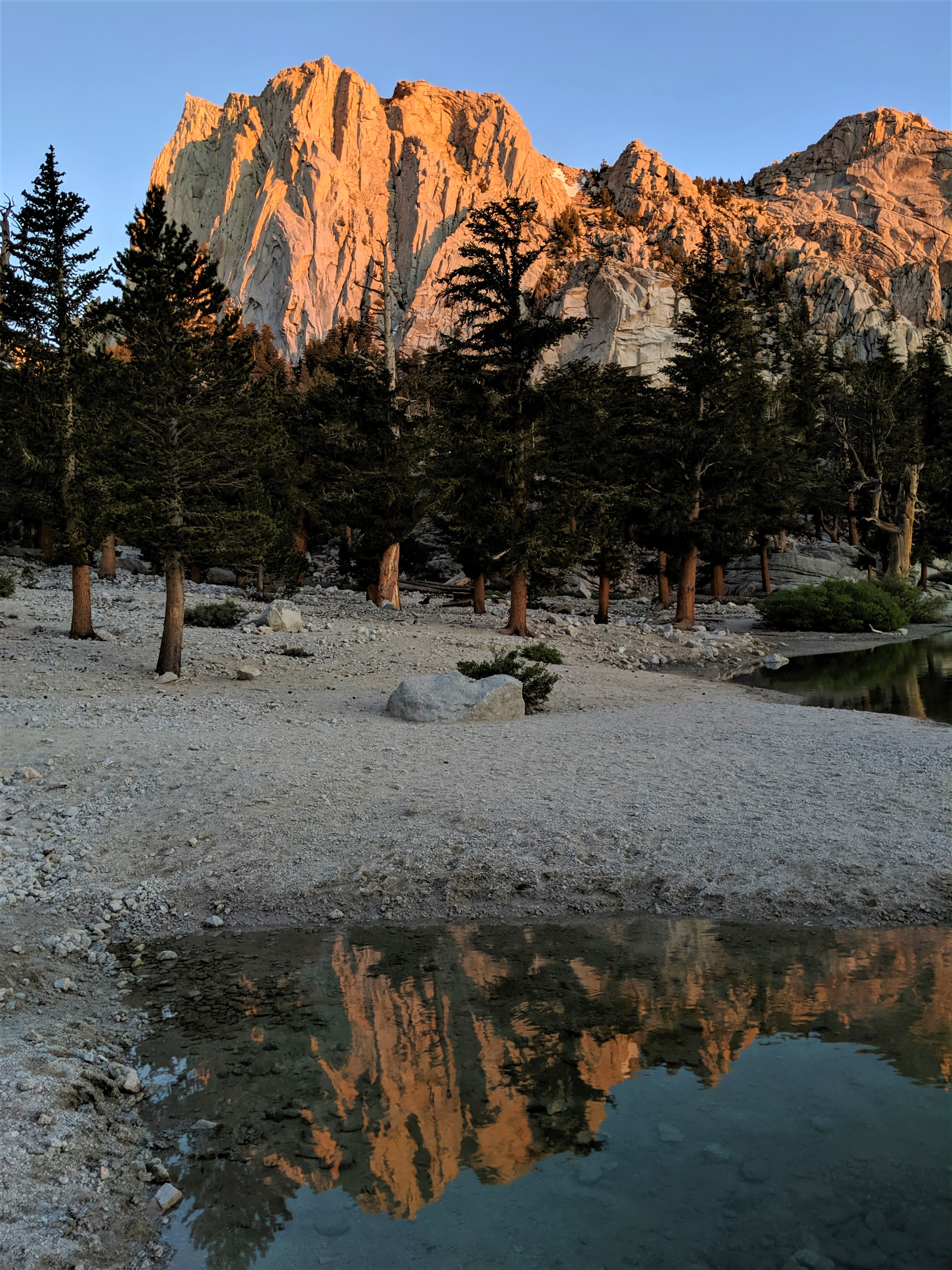
Sunrise on Thor Peak, from Mt. Whitney Trail

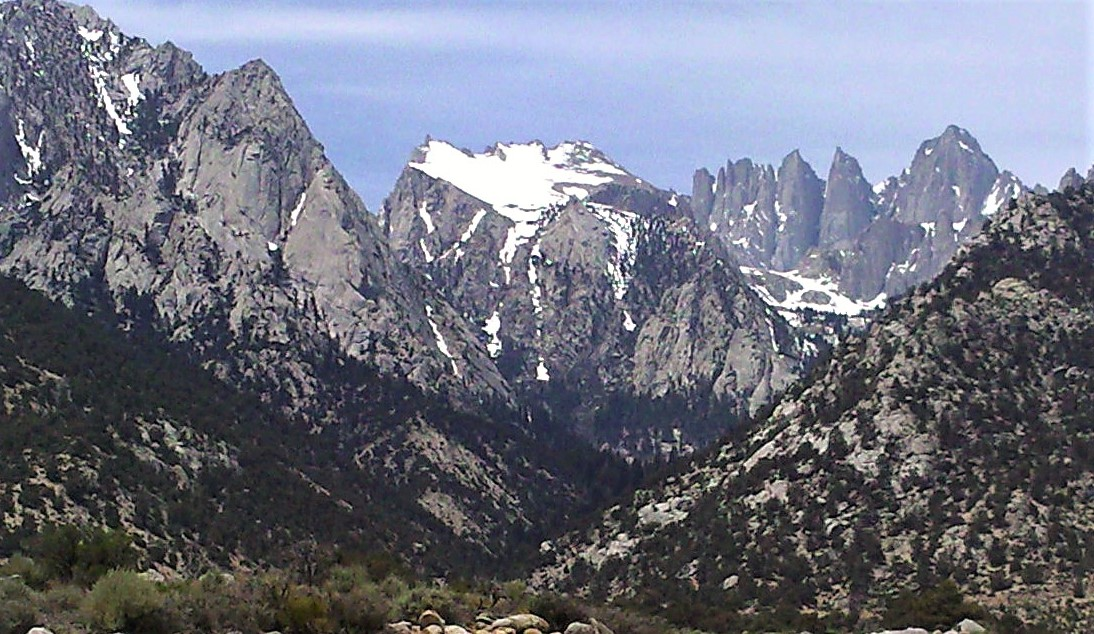
Snow-covered Thor, with Mt. Whitney (right)

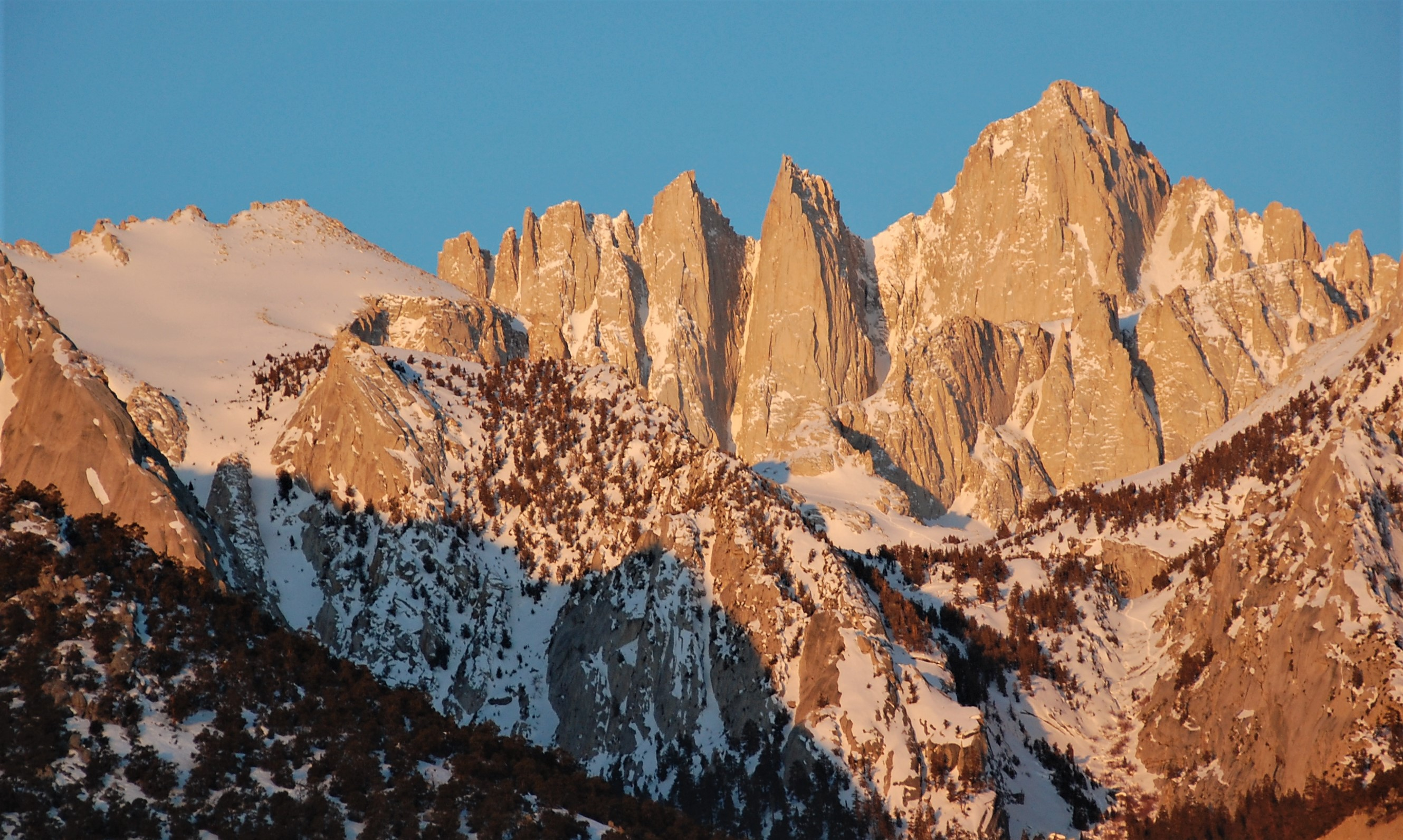
Snow-covered Thor Peak (left), with Mt. Whitney (right)

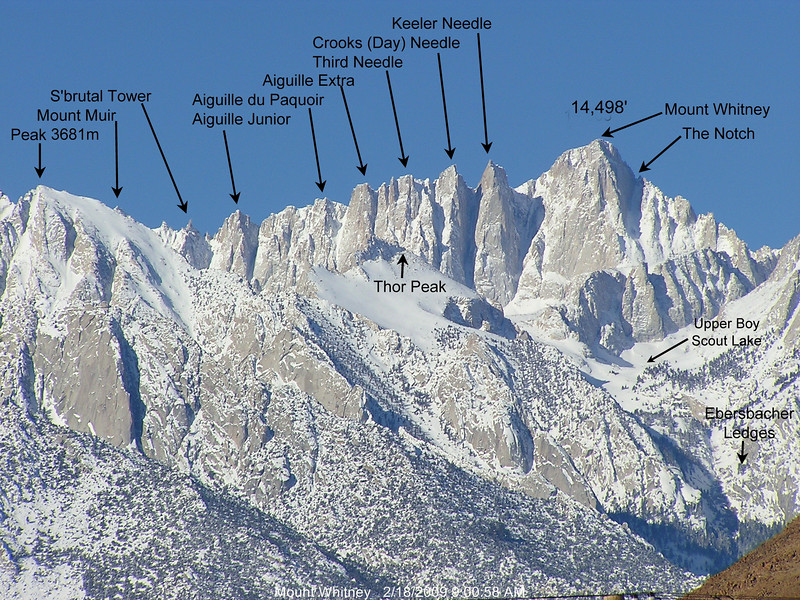
Thor Peak in center of photo

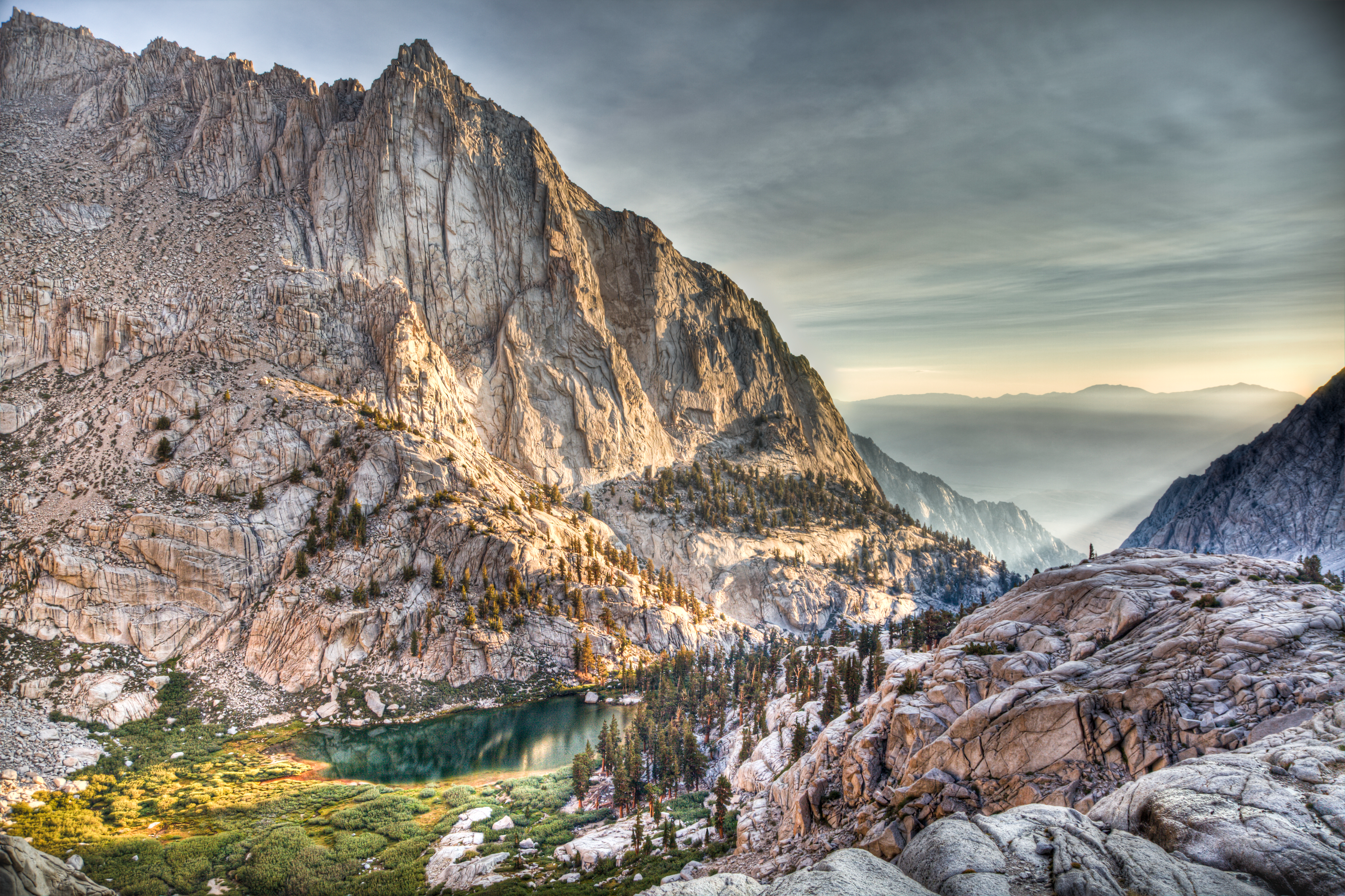
Thor Peak above Mirror Lake

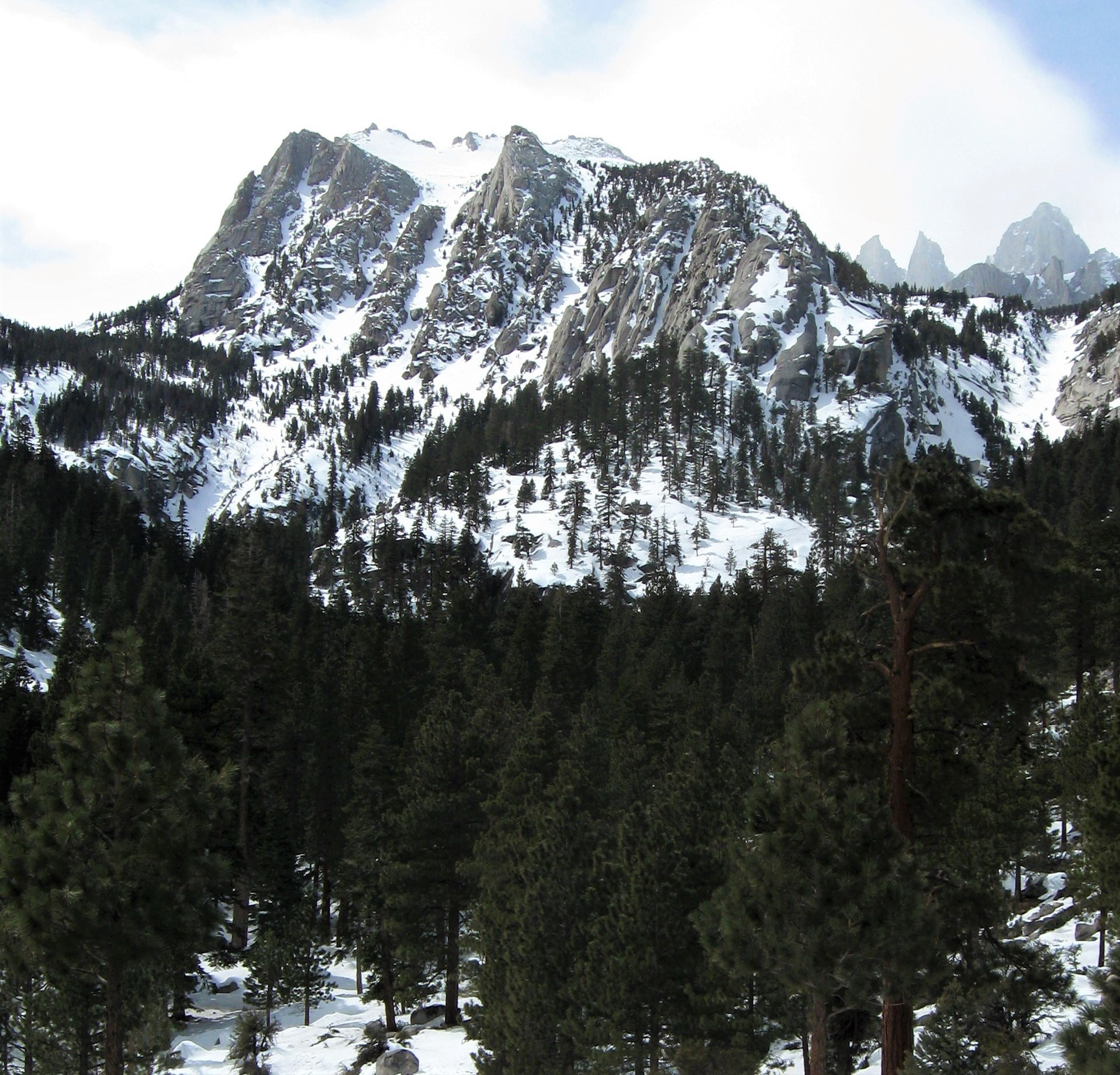
from Whitney Portal

== See also ==
- List of mountain peaks of California
